= Interchange station =

Railway station serving more than one route

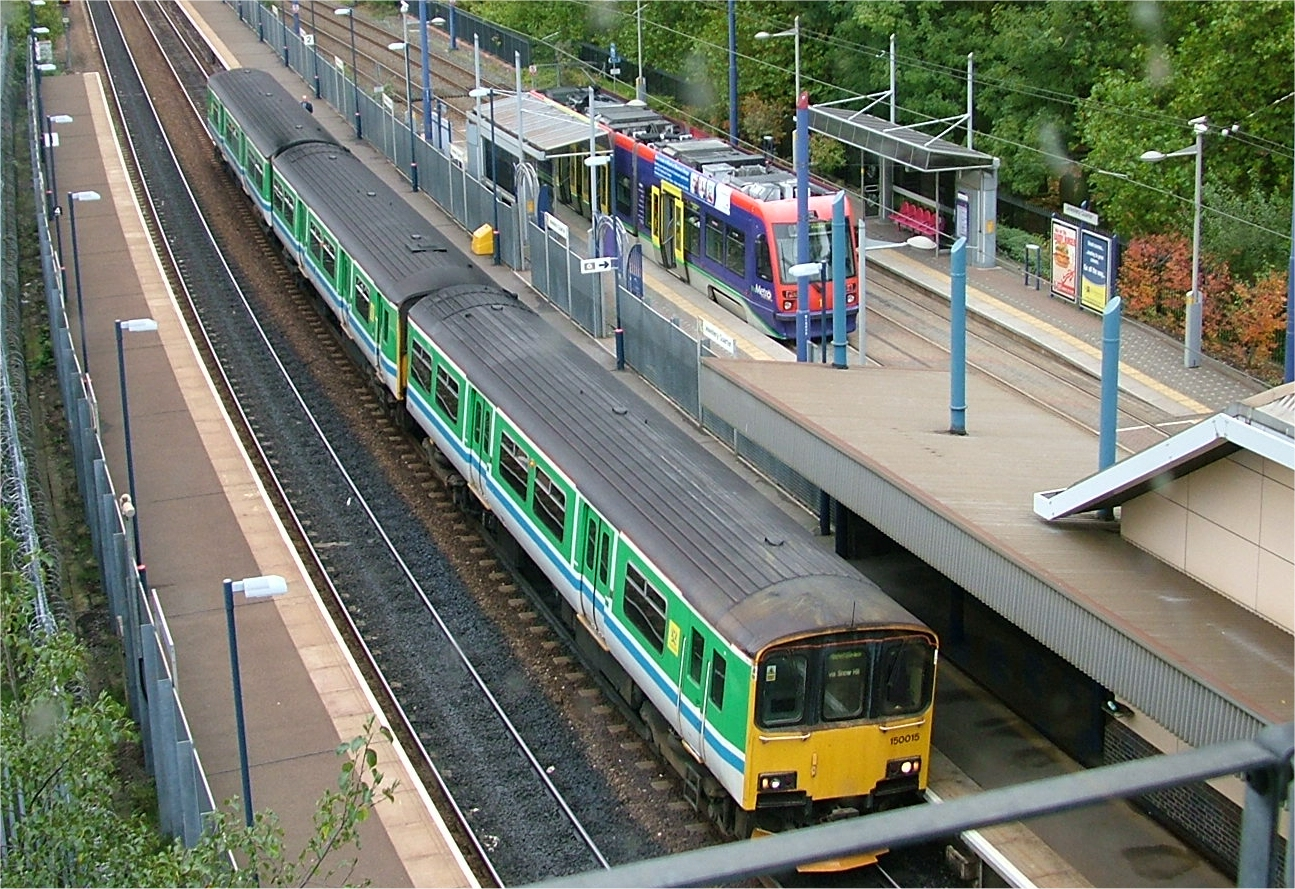
Jewellery Quarter, a tram/train interchange in Birmingham, United Kingdom.

An interchange station or a transfer station is a train station for more than one railway route in a public transport system that allows passengers to change from one route to another, often without having to leave a station or pay an additional fare.

Transfer may occur within the same mode, or between rail modes, or to buses (for stations with bus termini attached). Such stations usually have more platforms than single route stations. These stations can exist in either commercial centers or on the city outskirts in residential areas. Cities typically plan for land use around interchange stations for development. Passengers may be required to pay extra fare for the interchange if they leave a paid area.

== History ==
With the opening of the Woodside and Birkenhead Dock Street Tramway in 1873, Birkenhead Dock railway station in Birkenhead, England probably became the world's first tram to train interchange station.

== Examples ==
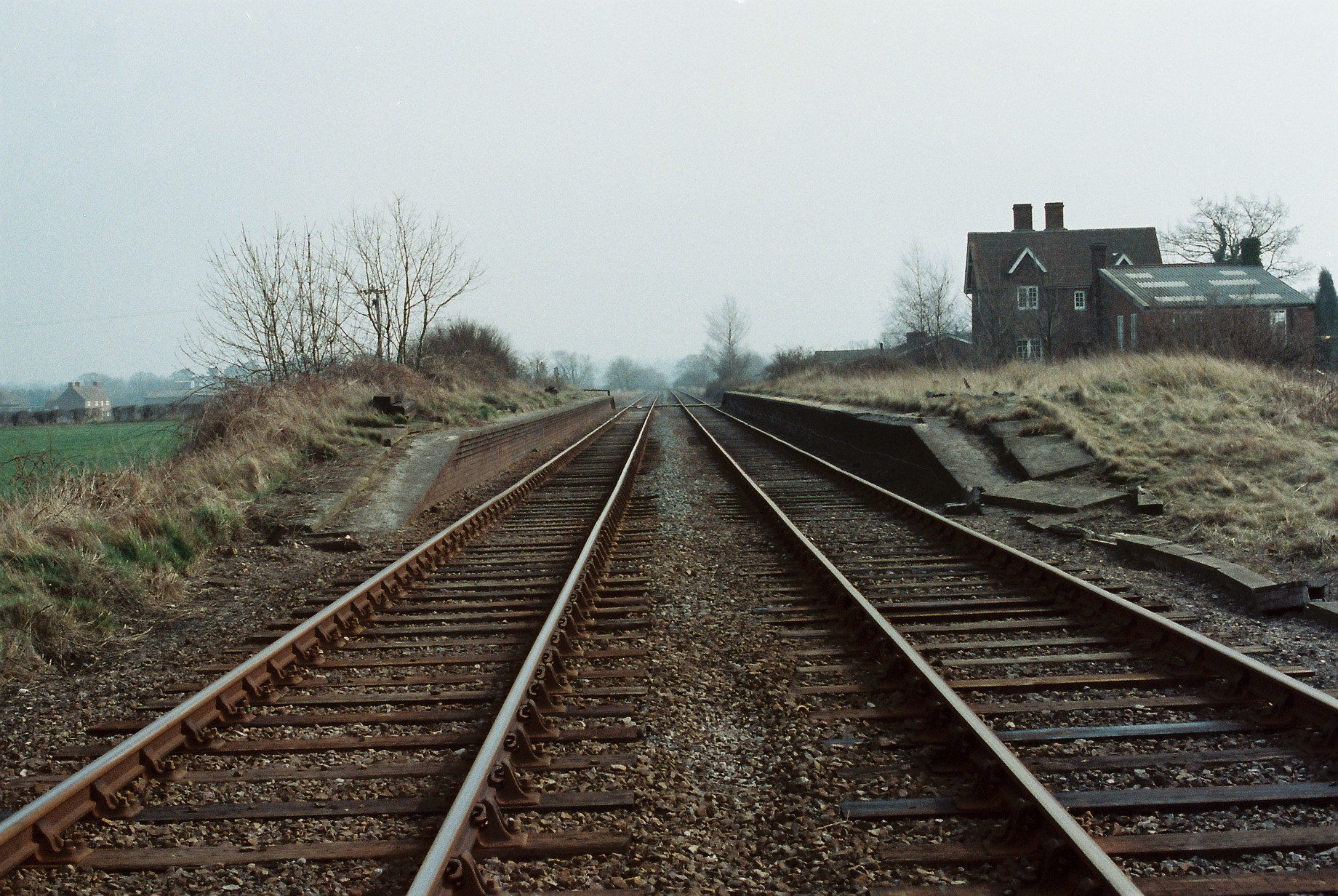
The remains of the remote Verney Junction interchange station

Verney Junction interchange station in Buckinghamshire, England was built at the point of two railway lines intersecting each other in open countryside. The station was built in an open remote field being used from 1868 to 1968.

The Manhattan Transfer (PRR station) on the Pennsylvania Railroad was located outside Newark, New Jersey in a relatively isolated area, and was used primarily for passenger interchange.

Sometimes cross-platform interchange is offered between mainline railways and city metro systems, such as Barking and Stratford stations in London.

There are also bus interchanges, where people can change between different bus routes with no extra fare or only the differences of the fares of the two routes. Examples include Tai Lam Tunnel Bus Interchange and Shing Mun Tunnel Bus Interchange in the New Territories, Hong Kong, and in the downtown of Lafayette, Indiana.

In London and Paris, a number of stations on the Underground in London and the Métro in Paris are interchanges between two or more rapid transit lines. Examples include King's Cross St. Pancras in London, an interchange between six lines and Chatelet in Paris, an interchange between five lines.

== Out-of-system interchange ==
In some cases, no dedicated underground passage or footbridge is provided, and therefore passengers have to transfer between two parts of a station through city streets. Examples include Kuramae Station of Toei in Tokyo, Japan, Lexington Avenue-59th Street/Lexington Avenue–63rd Street stations in New York City and several stations on the Transport for London system. In many cases, electronic ticketing allows transferring passengers re-admission to the transit system without paying fare a second time, as if they had never left the fare control area in the station (this process is called a "free out-of-system transfer").

== See also ==
- Cross-platform interchange
- Spanish solution
