= Hoi Mei Wan Beach =

Beach in Ting Kau, New Territories, Hong Kong

- Beach
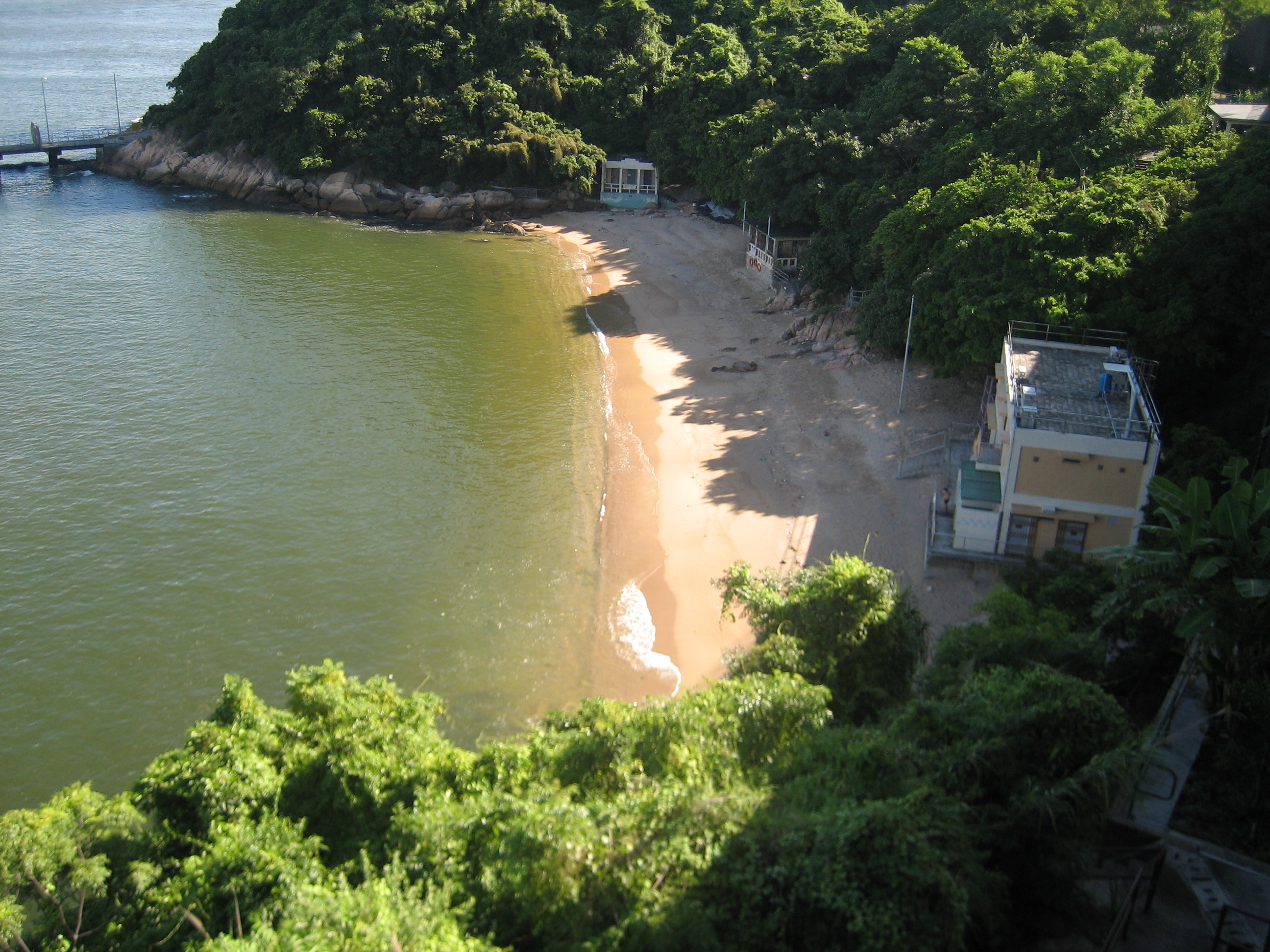
- Hoi Mei Wan Beach

- Coordinates: 22.36481°N 114.07085°E
- Location: Ting Kau, New Territories
- Patrolled by: Leisure and Cultural Services Department

Hoi Mei Wan Beach
- Traditional Chinese: 海美灣泳灘
- Simplified Chinese: 海美湾泳滩
Transcriptions
Standard Mandarin
- Hanyu Pinyin: Hǎi Měi Wān Yǒng Tān
Yue: Cantonese
- Jyutping: hoi2 mei5 waan1 wing6 taan1

Hoi Mei Wan Beach is a gazetted beach located near Airport Core Programme Exhibition Centre on Castle Peak Road in Ting Kau, New Territories, Hong Kong. The beach has barbecue pits and is managed by the Leisure and Cultural Services Department of the Hong Kong Government. The beach is rated as Grade 2 by the Environmental Protection Department for its water quality. The beach offers views of the Ting Kau Bridge as well as Tsing Ma Bridge.

== History ==
In 1979, the beach was gazetted by the Hong Kong Government. However, since May 1995, the beaches in Tsuen Wan District were closed due to the construction of the nearby Ting Kau and Tsing Ma Bridges and no longer allowed the public to swim due to its poor water quality and lifeguard services have to be suspended.

The beach has been reopened to the public for swimming since 15 June 2011.

== Water quality ==
In early 2003, Hoi Mei Wan Beach (along with three other nearby beaches) was closed because the water quality had worsened following the commissioning of Stage 1 of the Harbour Area Treatment Scheme (HATS). While HATS Stage 1 overall improved water quality in Victoria Harbour, it worsened conditions in the western area of the harbour because of the large quantity of non-disinfected effluent being released from the Stonecutters Island Sewage Treatment Works.

Permanent disinfection facilities were built at Stonecutters Island under HATS Stage 2, and water quality subsequently improved. Hoi Mei Wan Beach was officially reopened to swimmers on 15 June 2011, and lifeguards are provided there once again.

== Features ==
The beach has the following features:

- BBQ pits (3 nos.)
- Changing rooms
- Showers
- Toilets
- Bathing sheds

== See also ==
- Beaches of Hong Kong
