= Lido Beach (Hong Kong) =

Beach in Ting Kau, New Territories, Hong Kong

Coordinates: 22.367900°N 114.076213°E

- Beach
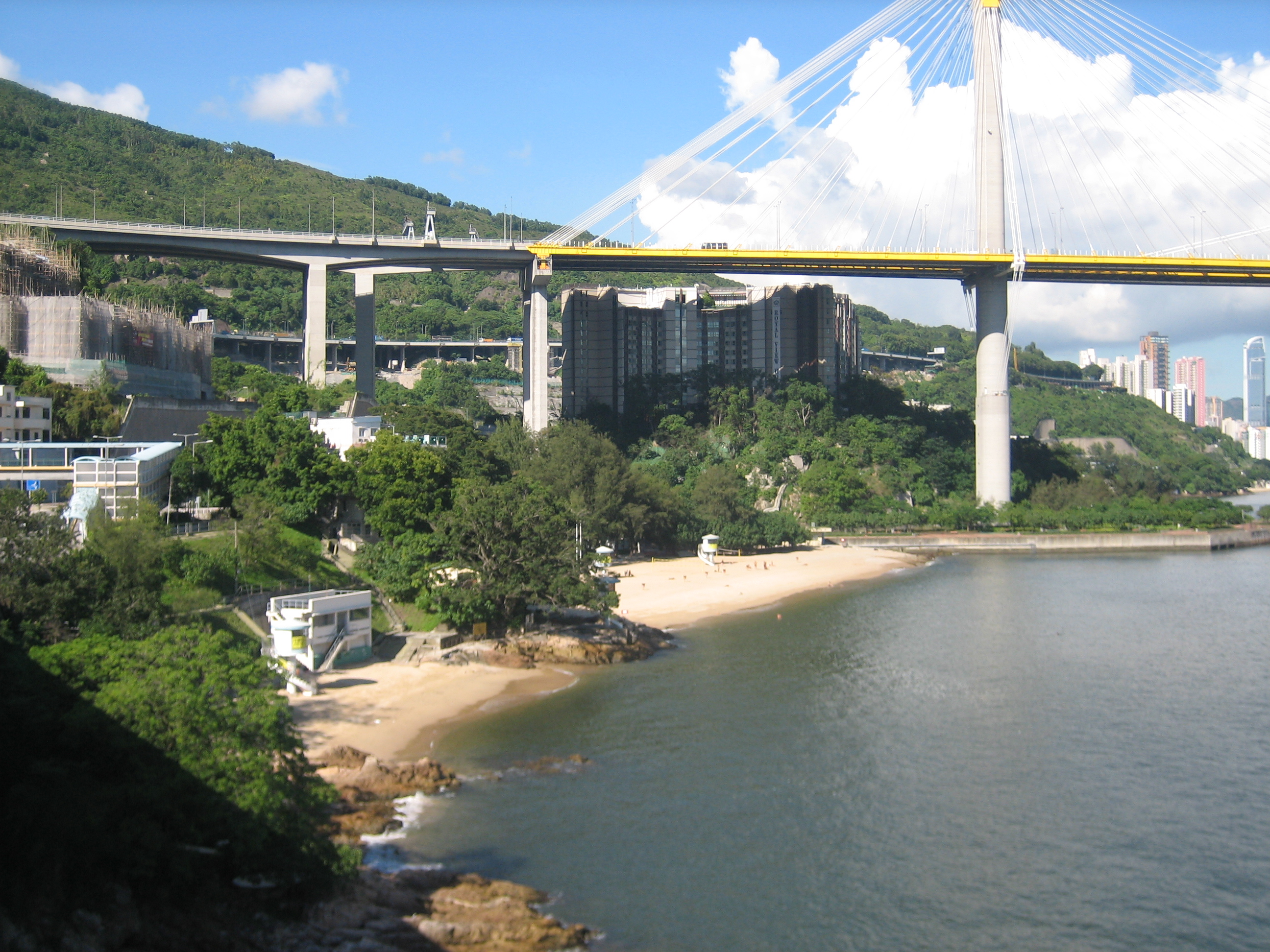
- View of Casam Beach (left) and Lido Beach (right)

- Location within Hong Kong
- Location: Ting Kau, New Territories; Hong Kong

Dimensions
  - Length: 200 metres
- Access: Castle Peak Road

Lido Beach
- Traditional Chinese: 麗都灣泳灘
- Simplified Chinese: 丽都湾泳滩
Transcriptions
Standard Mandarin
- Hanyu Pinyin: Lídūwān Yǒngtān
Yue: Cantonese
- Jyutping: lai6 dou1 waan1 wing6 taan1

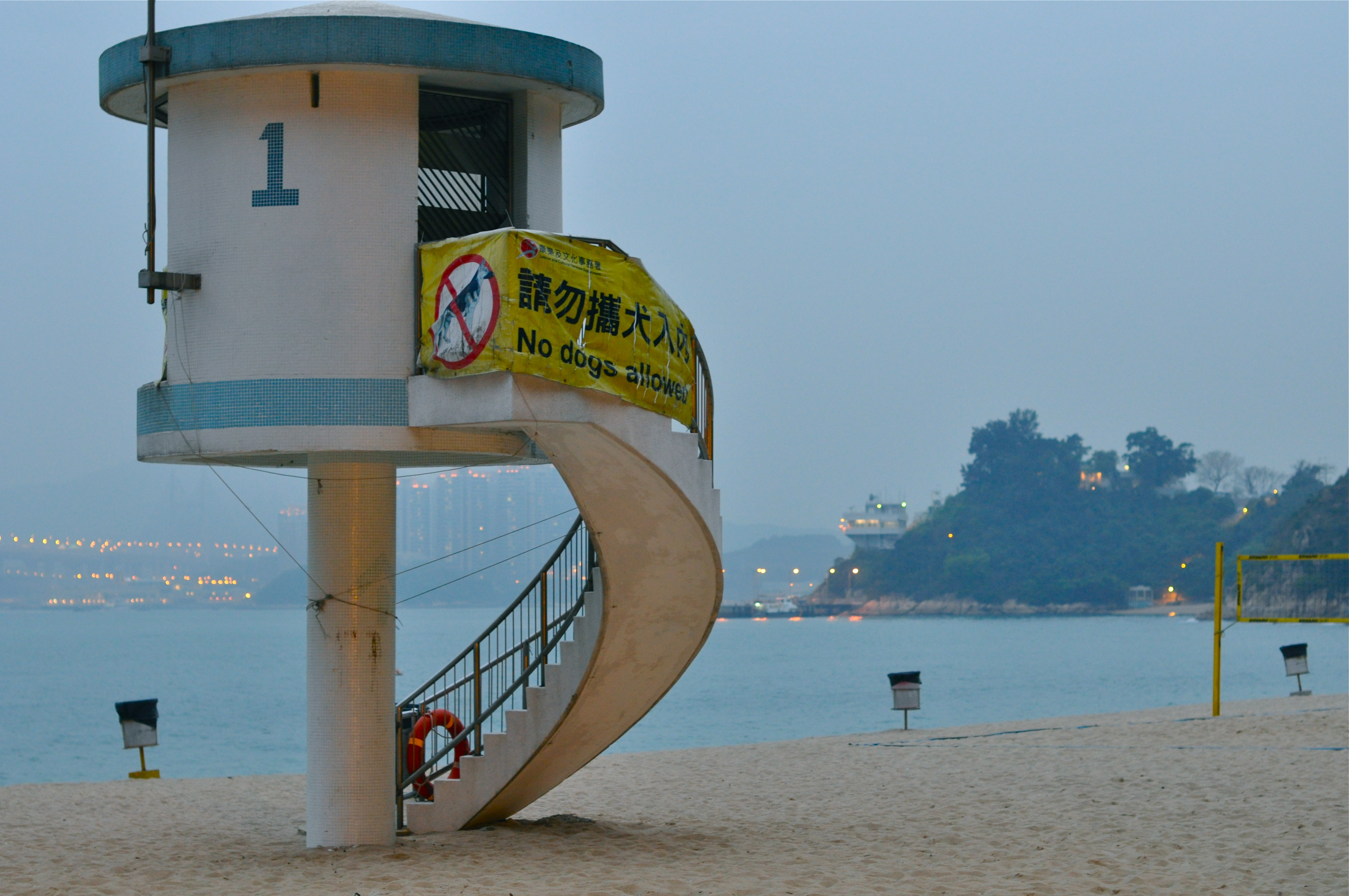
Lifeguard tower at Lido Beach.

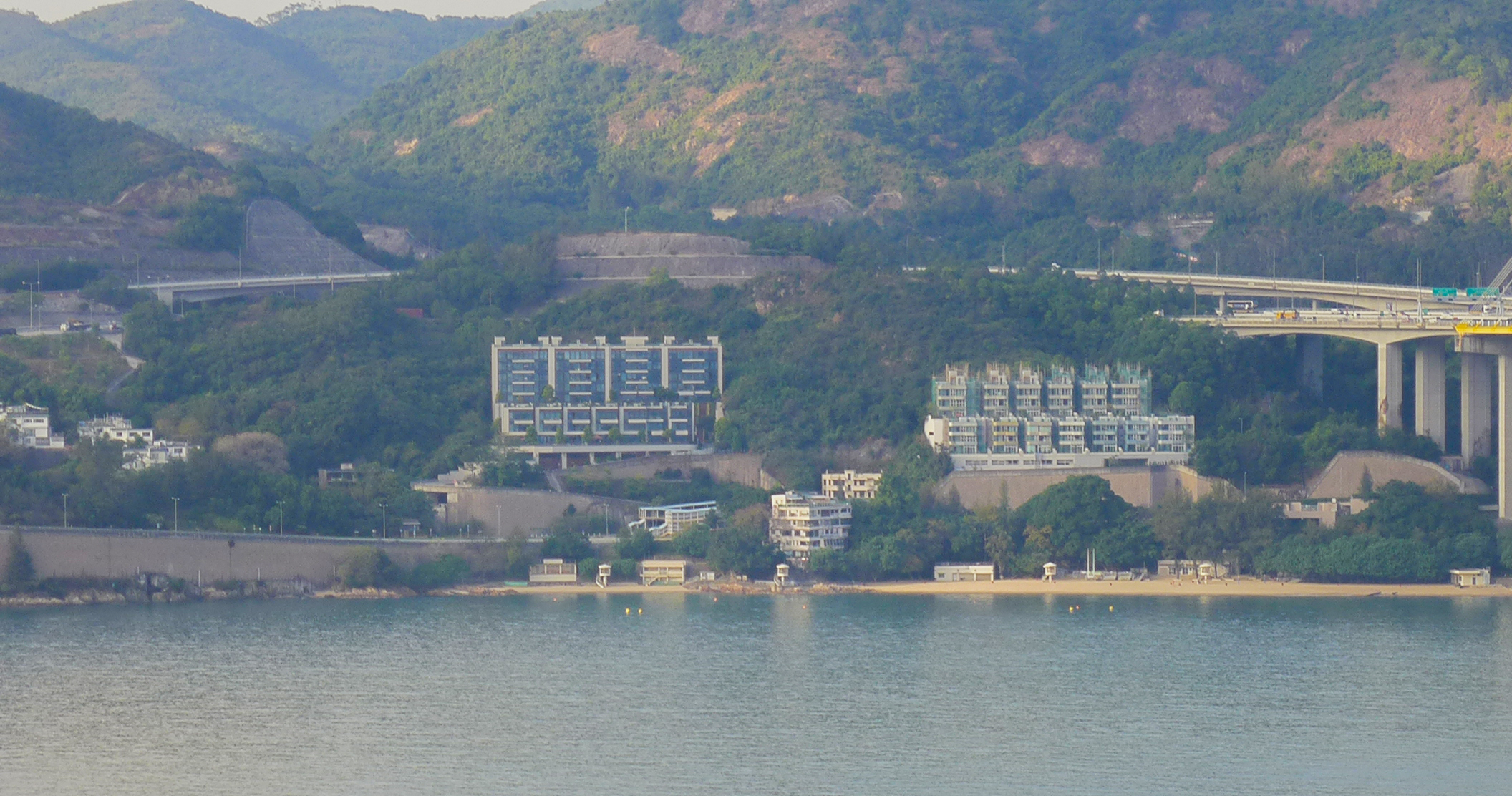
View of Casam Beach (centre) and Lido Beach (right)

Lido Beach (Chinese: 麗都灣泳灘) is located on Castle Peak Road in Ting Kau, New Territories, Hong Kong. It is a gazetted beach, meaning it is managed by the Leisure and Cultural Services Department, which provides lifeguards during the summer months.

The beach is about 200 metres in length, and is located beside the smaller Casam Beach (更生灣泳灘). It sits beside the northern abutment of the Ting Kau Bridge, and also offers views of the Tsing Ma Bridge.

== History ==
A two-storey beach building, housing changing rooms and other facilities, opened at Lido Beach on 1 May 1982. It was built at the same time as the beach building at Kadoorie Beach.

There was a landslide above the beach on 2 July 1997. Eight people, including two patrolling lifeguards, were buried in mud. They survived with injuries.

Amid the backdrop of several shark attacks, the Regional Council moved in 1995 to install shark nets at certain beaches. On 7 July 1995 the council decided to extend the shark net programme to Lido Beach, Butterfly Beach, and Tung Wan in Cheung Chau.

Two volleyball courts were set up at the beach in July 2003.

== Facilities ==
- Beach volleyball courts
- Changing rooms and showers
- Toilets
- Tuck shop

== Water quality ==
In early 2003, Lido Beach (along with three other nearby beaches) was closed because the water quality had worsened following the commissioning of Stage 1 of the Harbour Area Treatment Scheme (HATS). While HATS Stage 1 overall improved water quality in Victoria Harbour, it worsened conditions in the western area of the harbour because of the large quantity of non-disinfected effluent being released from the Stonecutters Island Sewage Treatment Works.

Despite the closure of the beach, public patronage remained high, with attendance of about 41,071 from March to October 2003. The Public Accounts Committee of the Legislative Council expressed their "grave concern" over the situation, given the health hazard the water quality posed to swimmers, and urged the government to expedite measures to disinfect the effluent from the sewage treatment plant.

Permanent disinfection facilities were built at Stonecutters Island under HATS Stage 2, and water quality subsequently improved. Lido Beach was officially reopened to swimmers on 15 June 2011, and lifeguards are provided there once again.
