= Approach Beach =

Beach in Ting Kau, New Territories, Hong Kong

- Beach
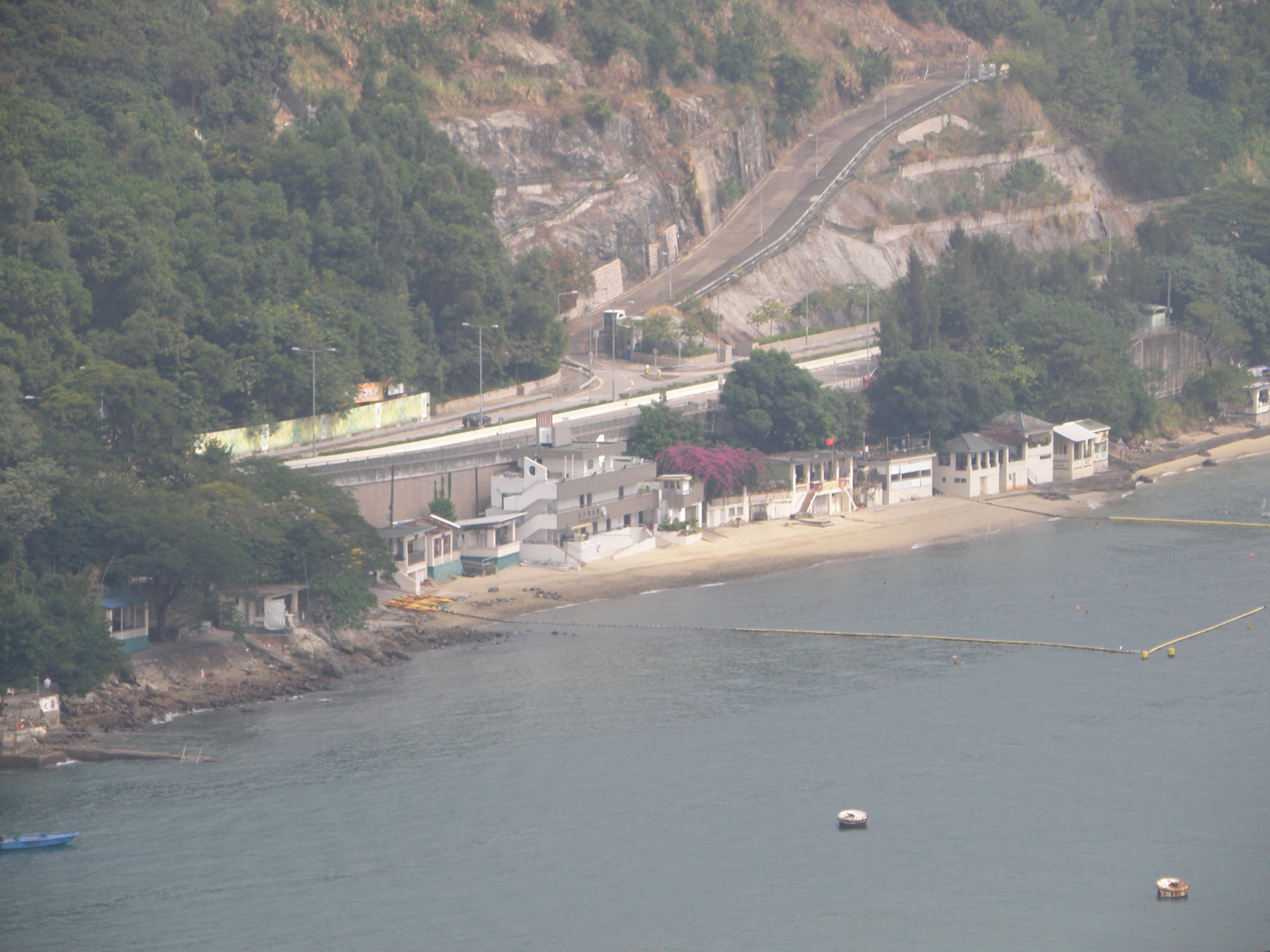
- Approach Beach

- Coordinates: 22.36739°N 114.08651°E
- Location: Ting Kau, New Territories
- Patrolled by: Leisure and Cultural Services Department

Approach Beach
- Traditional Chinese: 近水灣泳灘
- Simplified Chinese: 近水湾泳滩
Transcriptions
Standard Mandarin
- Hanyu Pinyin: Jìn Shuǐ Wān Yǒng Tān
Yue: Cantonese
- Jyutping: gan6 seoi2 waan1 wing6 taan1

Approach Beach is a gazetted beach located near Yau Kom Tau on Castle Peak Road in Ting Kau, New Territories, Hong Kong. The beach has barbecue pits and is managed by the Leisure and Cultural Services Department of the Hong Kong Government. The beach is rated as Grade 2 by the Environmental Protection Department for its water quality.

The beach, along with Ting Kau Beach, is one of the only two gazetted beaches in Tsuen Wan District that can "swim in Victoria Harbour". The beach offers views of the Ting Kau Bridge as well as Tsing Ma Bridge.

== History ==
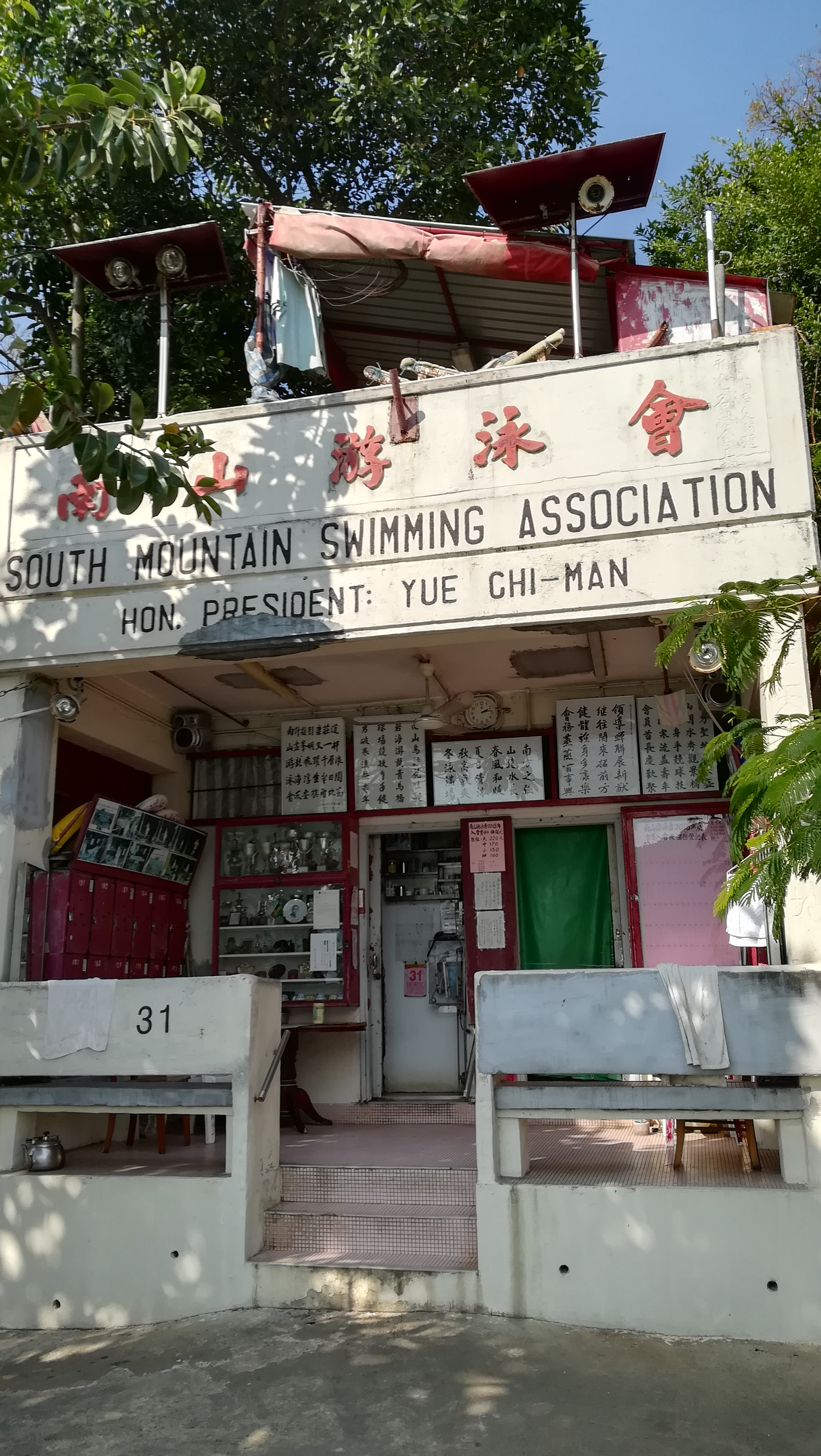
The South Mountain Swimming Association (南山游泳會) which is located next to the Approach Beach

In May 1987, the beach was gazetted by the Hong Kong Government and Hong Kong Jockey Club assisted Regional Council to open the beach. Less than ten years after the opening, the oil pollution problem due to large ships had become more and more serious. However, since May 1995, the beaches in Tsuen Wan District were closed due to the construction of the nearby Ting Kau and Tsing Ma Bridges and no longer allowed the public to swim due to its poor water quality and lifeguard services have to be suspended.

The beach has been reopened to the public for swimming since 15 June 2011.

== Water quality ==
In 1995, Approach Beach (along with two other nearby beaches) was closed because the water quality had worsened following the commissioning of Stage 1 of the Harbour Area Treatment Scheme (HATS). While HATS Stage 1 overall improved water quality in Victoria Harbour, it worsened conditions in the western area of the harbour because of the large quantity of non-disinfected effluent being released from the Stonecutters Island Sewage Treatment Works.

Permanent disinfection facilities were built at Stonecutters Island under HATS Stage 2, and water quality subsequently improved. Approach Beach was officially reopened to swimmers on 15 June 2011, and lifeguards are provided there once again.

== Features ==
The beach has the following features:

- BBQ pits (2 nos.)
- Changing rooms
- Showers
- Toilets
- Bathing sheds

== See also ==
- Beaches of Hong Kong
