= Shark barrier =

Seabed-to-surface protective barrier to prevent shark attacks on humans

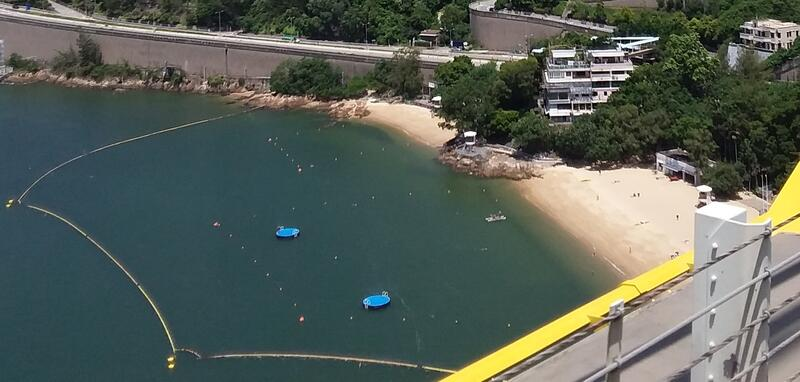
Shark prevention net in Lido Beach, Hong Kong. The yellow polyethylene pipes are visible on the sea surface.

A shark barrier (otherwise known as a "shark-proof enclosure" or "beach enclosure") is seabed-to-surface protective barrier that is placed around a beach to protect people from shark attacks. Often confused with shark nets, shark barriers form a fully enclosed swimming area that prevents sharks from entering (nets aim to reduce shark populations). Shark barrier design has evolved from rudimentary fencing materials to netted structures held in place with buoys and anchors. Recent designs have used plastics to increase strength, versatility and to reduce the environmental damage of bycatch.

While highly criticised, shark nets are common in Australia and South Africa. In contrast, Hong Kong invented the shark prevention net in the early-1990s in response to a series of fatal shark attacks between 1991 and 1995. The net, which blocks sharks from entering swimming areas from the seabed to the surface, is environmentally friendly, significantly reduces bycatch, and is resistant to strong typhoons. They were installed on all the gazetted beaches. While the cost is efficient in Hong Kong, it could be prohibitive for the extensive beaches in Australia and South Africa.

== Shark barriers vs shark nets ==
Shark barriers are commonly mistaken for shark nets. While they have the same objective of protecting swimmers, they have different characteristics as follows:

=== Exclusion method ===
Shark barriers work on the principle of excluding sharks from a designated swimming area. Shark barriers form an "underwater fence" from seabed-to-surface, beach-to-beach. Shark barriers are seen as a more environmentally friendly option as they largely avoid bycatch, however they cannot protect the same sized area as culling methods.

=== Netting method ===
Shark (meshing) nets operate as a catch-and-kill strategy to reduce the incidence rate of shark attack by reducing the local population size of sharks. Shark nets have been heavily criticized in the media for the environmental effects of bycatch. They also do not provide a fully enclosed swimming area as sharks can swim above, below or around them.

=== Suitability for surf beaches ===
Shark barriers are not generally used on surf beaches because they usually disintegrate in the swell and so are normally constructed only around sheltered areas such as harbour beaches. Where there are surf conditions at Hong Kong beaches, the swell is "typically small". Even if they were in place at surf beaches, they would not protect surfers who go some distance from shore.

The shark nets are more suitable for surf beaches as they can be anchored beyond the deepest sandbank and can be easily taken out of the water whenever any big swell is forecast.

== Australia ==
Shark barriers are currently used in Queensland, New South Wales, South Australia and Western Australia. Many of the shark barriers used in Queensland also feature protection from venomous jellyfish.

Shark barriers are often made out of netting; held in place by a system of piles, anchors and buoys. Netted barriers are susceptible to damage from strong ocean forces and so are generally limited to sheltered bays and beaches and favourable seasons and weather conditions.

Following the controversial Western Australian shark cull, the Western Australian State Government trialled a netted shark barrier in Dunsborough in 2013/14 and allocated funds for a new shark barrier to be installed in Busselton. Environmentally friendly shark barriers have also been developed in Western Australia in response to a string of fatal shark attacks on the WA coastline. As of 2025, 8 shark barriers have been installed on WA beaches.

== Hong Kong ==
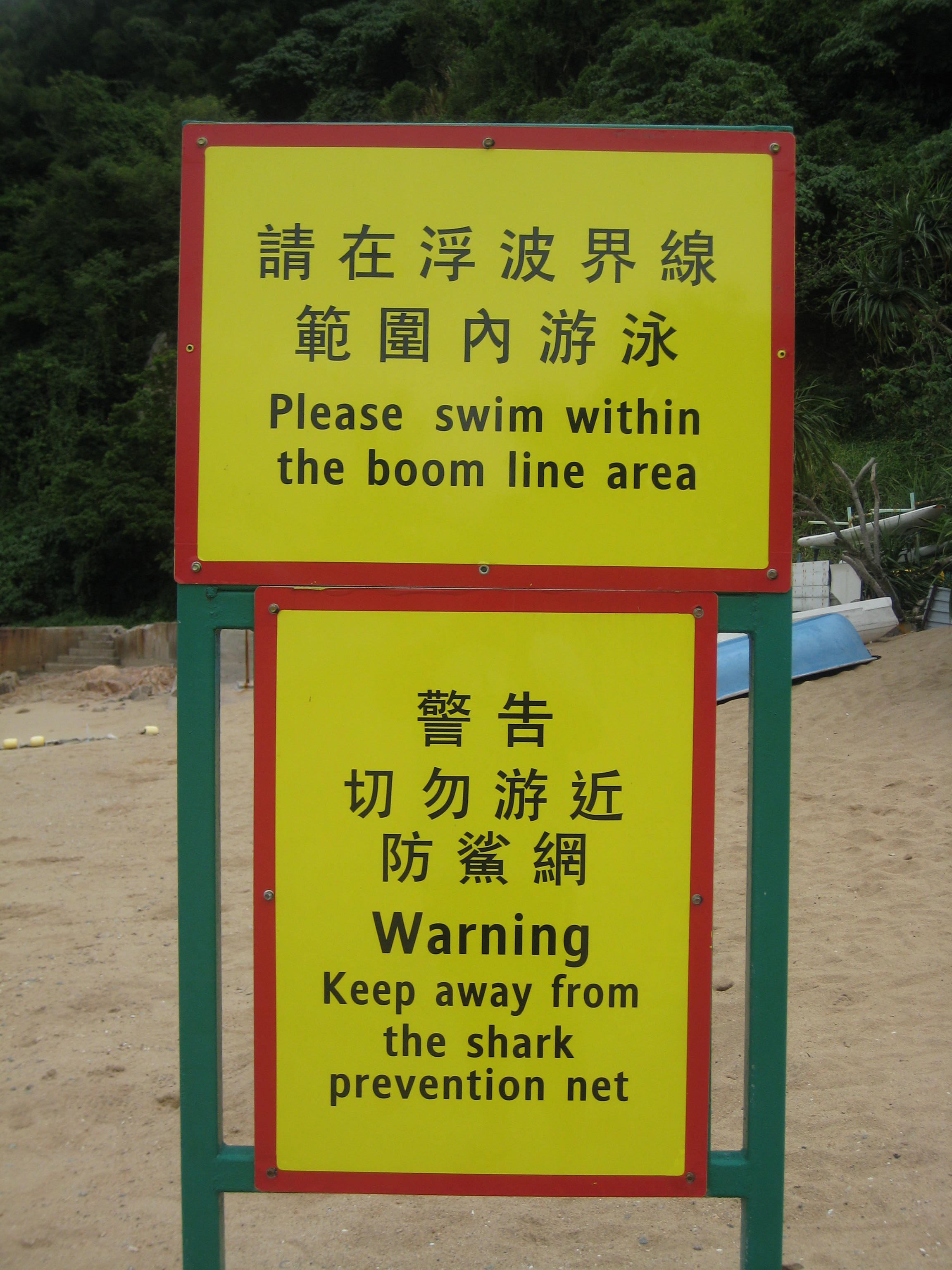
Safety warning sign to keep swimmer from the shark prevention net on Kwun Yam Beach in Hong Kong.

In Hong Kong, after three swimmers were killed by sharks in 1995, the government installed shark nets on gazetted beaches. Unlike the long-line and gill-net designs commonly used in Australia and South Africa, these are permanent installations and work as barrier nets. There have been zero fatalities since installation in 1995. As of 2014, shark nets are in place at 32 Hong Kong beaches.

=== Barrier net design ===
The Hong Kong nets are generally 35 mm square on the surface 2 m and 100 mm square thereafter. They are suspended off 225 mm HDPE pipe or BL14 Marine Float Lines, and anchored strongly to resist the many typhoons and waves up to 10 m. They are anti-fouled, and spend an average of 9 months a year in the water. An average net enclosure would be 500 m long and either semi-circular or rectangular in shape. They are diver-inspected a minimum of two times a week, and independent verification is required. They also exclude floating refuse, and clearly define the swimming area. They can be clearly picked out on Google Earth - at 22^14'38" North, 114^11'26" East, see "Repulse Bay".

== Réunion Island ==
On Réunion Island following 19 shark attacks since 2011, including 7 fatalities "Smart" drumlines are used, in conjunction with shark nets. In 2015 the island, supported by France, spent two million Euros on two shark-proof fences / shark enclosures on the west of the island. The fences are strung below the water's surface and cost the region a million Euros a year to maintain. A 610m net, protecting a bathing area of 84,000sq m, has been installed off Boucan Canot and a 500m net has been installed off Roches Noires. The shark nets are subject to damage from heavy swells. On the 27 August 2016 a surfer lost an arm and a foot from a shark attack whilst surfing within one of the share enclosures. It was reported that at the time of the attack there was a two-meter hole in the nets, most probably caused by the swell.

== Environmentally-friendly shark barriers ==
Development in materials has led to innovative plastic barrier designs that prevents marine bycatch. The rigid barrier panels allow fish and small marine creatures to swim through unobstructed, while restricting larger marine predators. New materials also potentially increase the scope of use beyond calmer waters.

The first environmentally friendly shark barrier was trialled at Coogee Beach in Western Australia. The trial ran for four months between December 2013 and April 2014. Since this trial, new designs have emerged, including a new barrier from local company Eco Shark Barriers which was purchased by the City of Cockburn in 2014 (currently operational at Coogee Beach).

Another barrier design has been produced from Form Designs Australia, who were also involved in the trial of the Eco Shark Barrier. The "Bionic Barrier" was designed to overcome some of the issues that arose in the trial, including increasing flexibility with hinge panels to adapt to tides and swell. The structural performance of this design could not be assessed although it potentially improves the current system.

The general response by the public towards the environmentally friendly shark barrier at Coogee was positive (95%). It was also noted that the barrier acted as a form of artificial reef or FAD (fish attracting device) which was seen as a positive point of interest for the beach.

In 2016 trials of two eco friendly shark barriers in NSW, Australia were discontinued after both manufacturers were unable to safely and effectively install the barriers. Installation of the "eco barrier" by Eco Shark Barriers at the popular surf break Lighthouse Beach, Ballina, on the New South Wales far north coast, had been stopped by the amount of sand movement which made it impossible for divers to install the moorings. Another kind of barrier, the Aquarius Barrier, designed by a different company, Global Marine Enclosures, was installed at Seven Mile Beach, Lennox Head, about 10 km up the coast. Head-high swell came over the course of a weekend and the barrier started to fray and disintegrate. Plastic from the barrier was scattered for kilometres. Locals were referring to the Aquarius Barrier as an "environmental disaster".
