= Tai Lam Tunnel =

Tunnel in New Territories, Hong Kong

Coordinates: 22.394999°N 114.060831°E

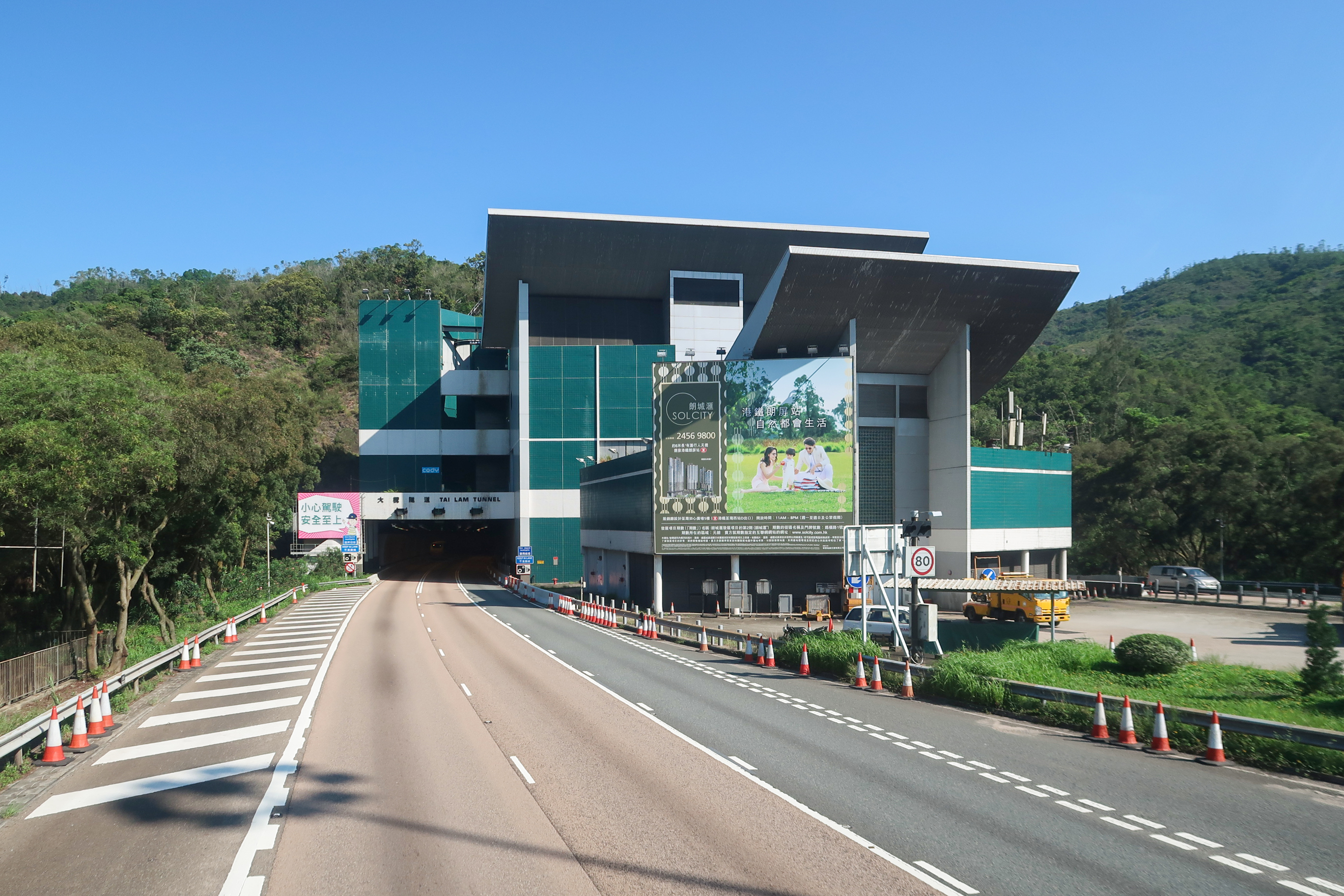
- Entrance of Tai Lam Tunnel
- Interactive map of Tai Lam Tunnel

Overview
- Status: Active
- System: Part of Route 3
- Start: Ting Kau
- End: Pat Heung

Operation
- Opened: 25 May 1998; 28 years ago
- Owner: Hong Kong Government
- Operator: Government of Hong Kong (2025 May – Present)
- Traffic: Vehicular
- Vehicles per day: 140,000

Technical
- Length: 3.8 km (2.4 mi)
- No. of lanes: 6 lanes (3 lanes per direction)
- Operating speed: 70 km/h (45 mph)

Tai Lam Tunnel (Chinese: 大欖隧道; Jyutping: daai6 laam5 seoi6 dou6) is a tunnel in Hong Kong that forms part of the Tsing Long Highway of Route 3. It links Pat Heung and Ting Kau in the western New Territories.

The tunnel was constructed to ease traffic congestion on the Tuen Mun Road, Castle Peak Road and in Tate's Cairn Tunnel. It also links traffic directly from New Territories West to urban areas of Kowloon West and Hong Kong Island, as well as Hong Kong International Airport and the Kwai Tsing Container Terminals.

== Specifications ==
The Tai Lam Tunnel is a 3.8 km (2.4 mi) dual 3-lane tunnel. The total length of the R3CPS (the tolled area) is 10.1 km (6.3 mi).

The Tai Lam Tunnel used to have a toll plaza at Pat Heung and about 1 km (0.62 mi) from the north tunnel portal, which consisted of 22 tollbooths, with 16 of which as manual tolls and 6 as Autotoll lanes. The tool plaza has been disused with all lanes converted for HKeToll. Vehicles do not need to stop and pay for tolls, which tolls are instead charged by scanning the vehicle's license plate.

== Construction and operation ==
Tai Lam Tunnel is a build-operate-transfer (B.O.T) project with a franchise period of 30 years (including the construction period). Its total construction cost was HK$7.25 billion. Construction on the tunnel started on 13 March 1995 and it was officially opened to traffic on 25 May 1998 to match the opening of the new Hong Kong International Airport.

The designed traffic capacity of Tai Lam Tunnel is 140,000 vehicles per day. In 2011/2012, the average daily traffic was over 54,000 vehicles.

According to the Transport Department of the Government of Hong Kong statistics, Tai Lam Tunnel has lower-than-average safety records. In 2023, the accident rate per million vehicle km was just 0.17.

== Tunnel tolls ==
The tunnel had a reputation for high tolls prior to the government's takeover, similar to the Western Harbour Crossing. The toll for private cars was HK$55, making it the second most expensive tunnel in Hong Kong (the most expensive being the Western Harbour Crossing at HK$60). For coaches, it was the highest in the city, about 4 times higher than the longer Tate's Cairn Tunnel.

Time-varying toll fees for the tunnel have taken effect after the government has taken over the ownership of the tunnel in May 2025. The toll fees of the tunnel have also decreased significantly, by 22% to 80%, since the government's takeover.

A transition charging arrangement exists for motorcycles and private cars, which the toll fee will gradually increase and decrease during the time period between off-peak times, peak times, and normal times. This measurement was justified by the Transport Department saying that they are "in place between different time slots to bridge the toll differentials in an orderly manner and reduce the incentive for drivers to deliberately accelerate or decelerate ahead of toll change."

Vehicle	Standard toll during public holidays	Standard toll during weekdays
Motorcycle (Note: The corresponding toll for all time slots is set at 40% of the private car toll.)	$7.2	$7.2-$18
Private car	$18	$18-$45
Taxi	$28	
Other vehicles	$43	

== Environmental protection and sustainable measures ==
The tunnel company performed compensatory tree planting at a rate of three replacement saplings for each tree felled. In total, 250,000 trees, 150,000 shrubs, and 60,000 climbing plants were planted during the construction period.

As for the conservation of wildlife, there is a small tunnel constructed at the south portal of Tai Lam Tunnel intended to alleviate the tunnel's impact on wildlife.

To keep pace with technology development, Tai Lam Tunnel has gradually replaced traditional light bulbs with light-emitting diodes (LEDs). The indicator lighting signals inside the tunnel tubes and at the toll plaza, as well as the lighting system in the administration building, have been replaced to reduce carbon emissions.

== See also ==
- Tai Lam Tunnel Bus Interchange

== Notes ==
Preceded by Ting Kau Bridge	Hong Kong Route 3 Tai Lam Tunnel	Succeeded by Tsing Long Highway
