= HKeToll =

Free-flow electronic toll collection system in Hong Kong

- Location: Hong Kong
- Launched: May 2023
- Predecessor: Autotoll
- Operator: Autotoll Limited
- Currency: Hong Kong Dollar
- Website: https://www.hketoll.gov.hk/

HKeToll (Chinese: 易通行) is a free-flow tolling system owned by the Transport Department in Hong Kong. It is operated by Autotoll Limited. The system has been gradually put into use in various government-owned tunnels in Hong Kong to replace traditional toll booths and Autotoll from May 2023 onward.

== History ==
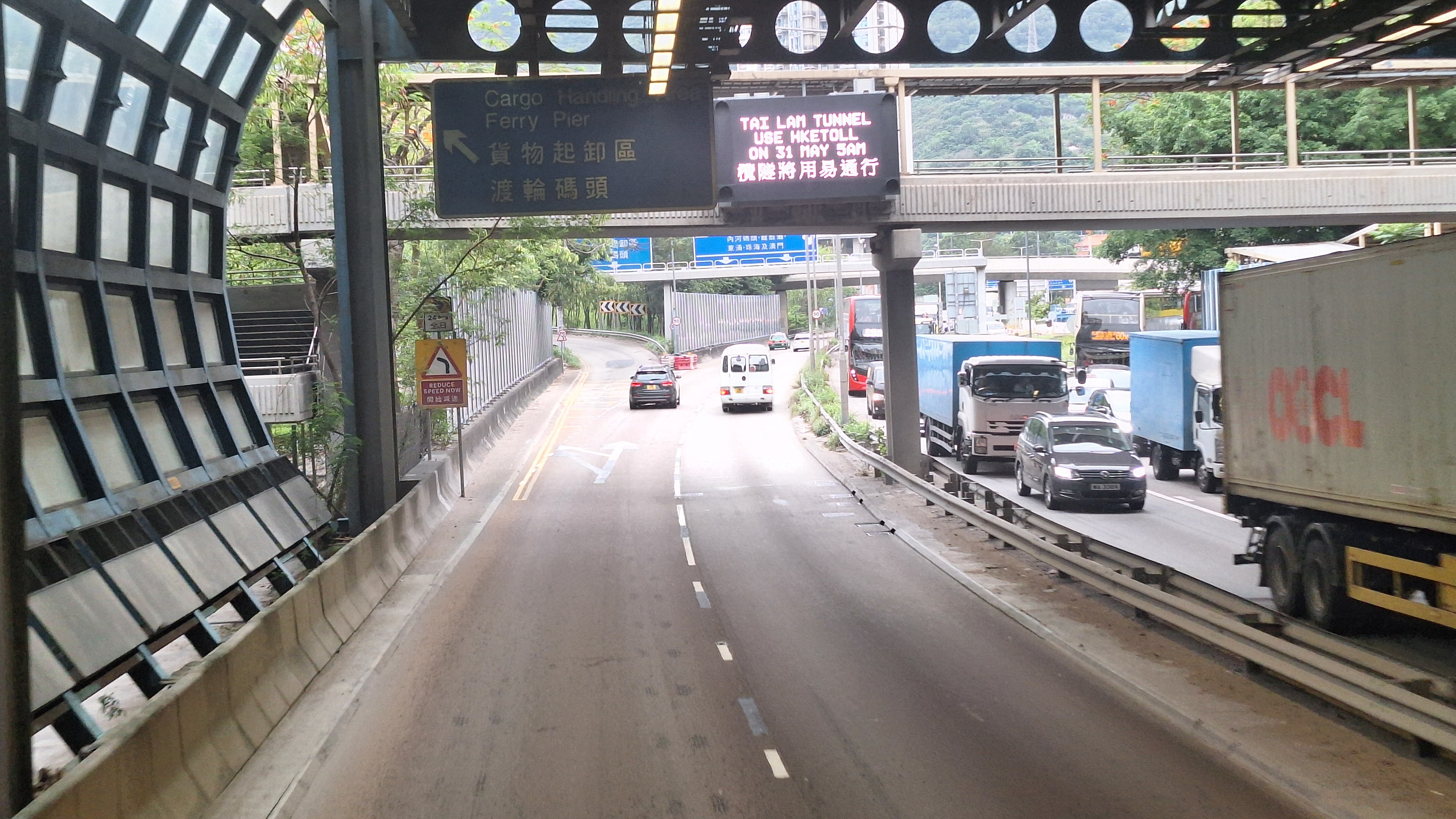
An expressway sign reminding drivers to switch to HKeToll

=== Proposal and legislation ===
In December 2017, the government of Hong Kong published the "Hong Kong Smart City Blueprint 2.0". In the blueprint, the government placed implementing a "Free-flow Tolling System at government tolled tunnels and Tsing Sha Control Area by early 2024" as one of its strategies of initiatives.

In January 2019, the Transport Department proposed to the Panel on Transport of the Legislative Council of implementing a "Free-flow Tolling System" at the Tseung Kwan O–Lam Tin Tunnel when it is commissioned. In the 2019 Policy Address however, it was announced that the tunnel will be toll free instead of having the originally proposed $3 toll fee, leading to the tendering of the project to be shelved.

The Free-Flow Tolling (Miscellaneous Amendments) Bill 2021 was later proposed to the Legislative Council in March 2021 and was made into law in November 2021, allowing the preparations of the HKeToll to formally commence.

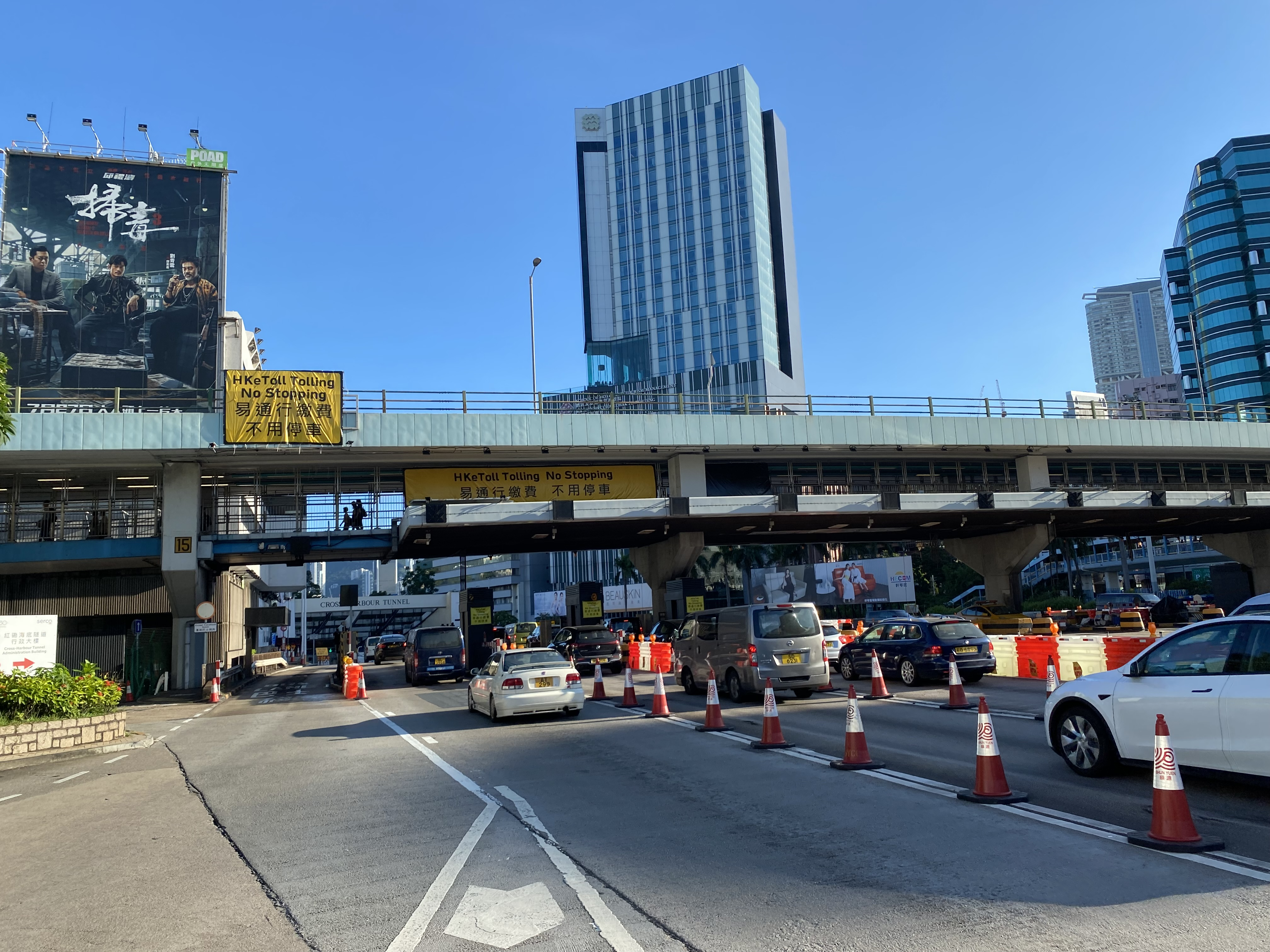
The Cross-Harbour Tunnel with HKeToll in operation

=== List of tunnels using HKeToll ===
Some of the tunnels were only able to implement HKeToll after the government has reclaimed its ownership.

Date of operation	Tunnel	References
7 May 2023	Tsing Sha Highway	
21 May 2023	Shing Mun Tunnels	
28 July 2023	Lion Rock Tunnel	
23 July 2023	Cross-Harbour Tunnel	
6 August 2023	Western Harbour Crossing	
27 August 2023	Eastern Harbour Crossing	
26 November 2023	Tate's Cairn Tunnel	
24 December 2023	Aberdeen Tunnel	
31 May 2025	Tai Lam Tunnel	

== Workings ==
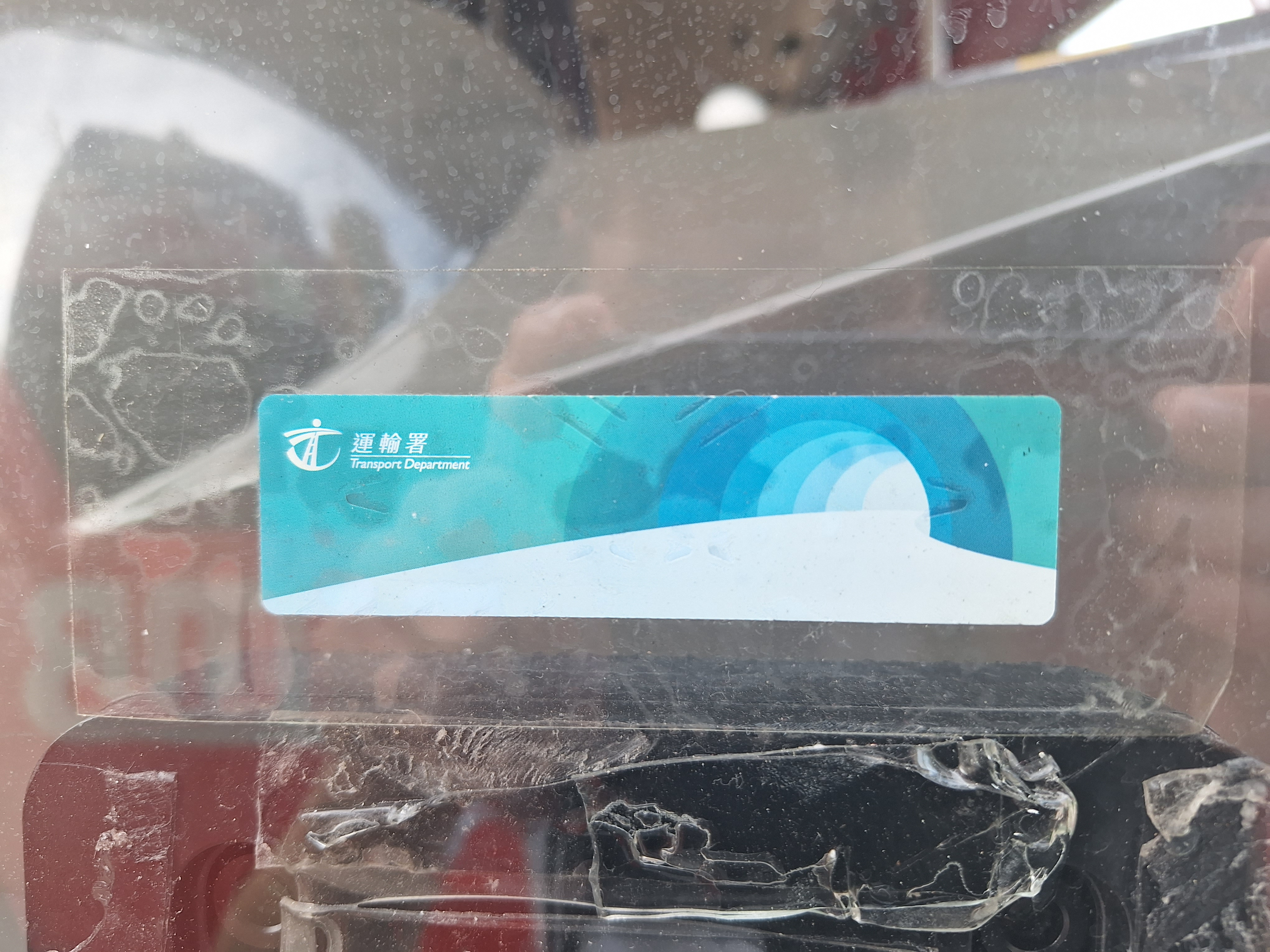
Vehicle Tag

Users using the HKeToll service would receive an RFID toll tag from the Transport Department, which is to be affixed to the vehicle's windscreen. The system will then either use RFID to retrieve information of the vehicle, or use cameras paired with ANPR to capture the vehicle's license plate when passing a tunnel.

There are different toll tags that are offered, the vehicle tag and the class tag. Toll payments for vehicles with a vehicle tag is done by a credit card or bank account that would automatically pay the toll amount, while vehicles with a class tag will have to top up their toll for amounts to be deducted directly from the tag when passing through a tunnel.

Tunnel tolls will be automatically deducted from the preset payment account of the vehicle owner if using a vehicle tag and from their tag itself directly if using a class tag. If the vehicle passing through a tunnel has not been set up for the payment service, the system will instead capture and identify the license plate number, then contact the vehicle owner for payment. The owner will then be required to pay the toll within 14 working days.

== Similar systems ==
- Taiwan: Taiwan Highway Electronic Toll Collection System
- Singapore: Electronic Road Pricing
- United States: E-ZPass

== See also ==
- Autotoll
- Electronic Toll Collection
