= Ting Kau Beach =

Beach in Ting Kau, New Territories, Hong Kong

- Beach
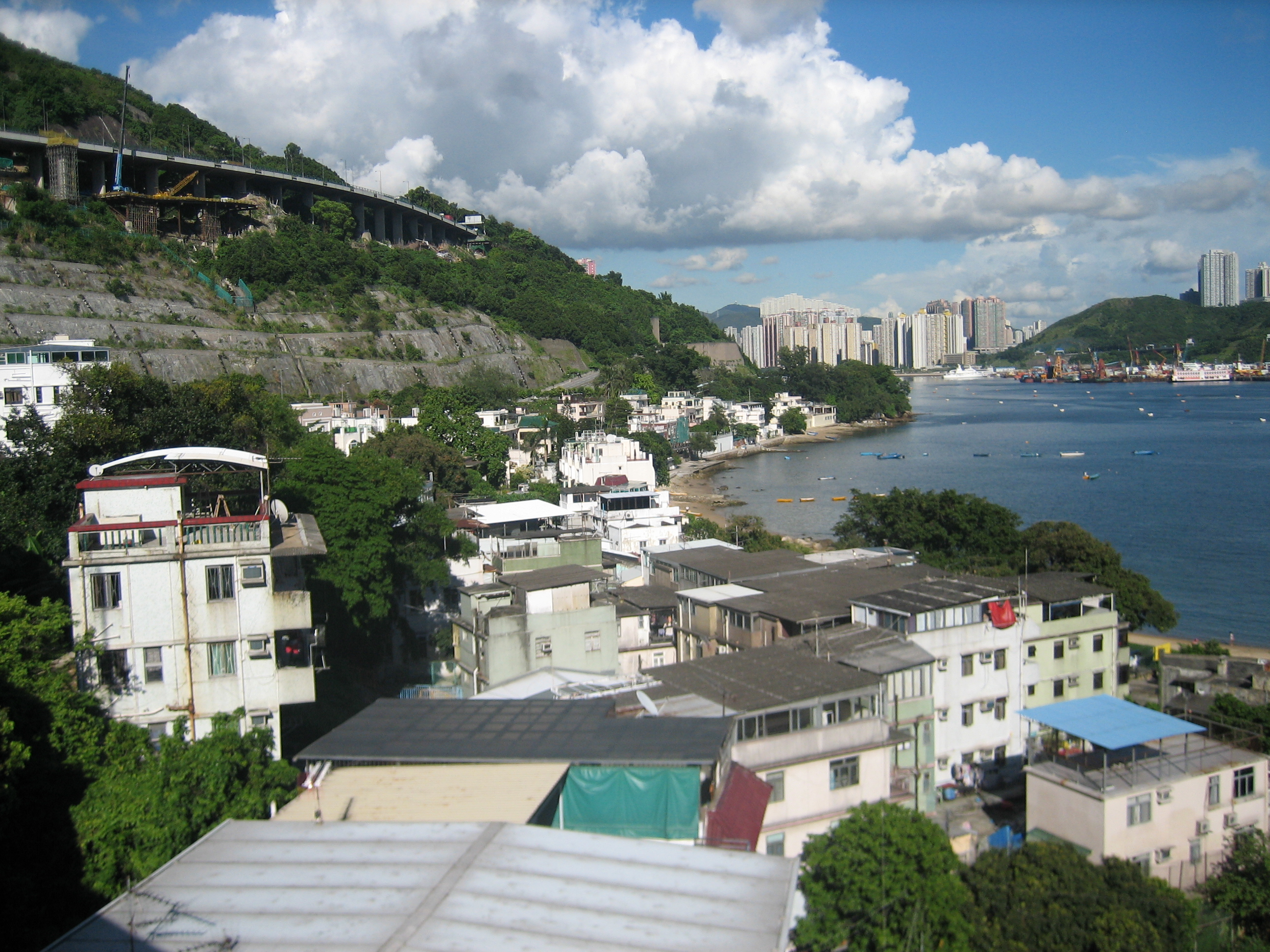
- Ting Kau Beach as seen from Castle Peak Road

- Coordinates: 22.36913°N 114.07975°E
- Location: Ting Kau, New Territories
- Patrolled by: Leisure and Cultural Services Department

Ting Kau Beach
- Traditional Chinese: 汀九灣泳灘
- Simplified Chinese: 汀九湾泳滩
Transcriptions
Standard Mandarin
- Hanyu Pinyin: Tīng Jiǔ Wān Yǒng Tān
Yue: Cantonese
- Jyutping: ting1 gau2 waan1 wing6 taan1

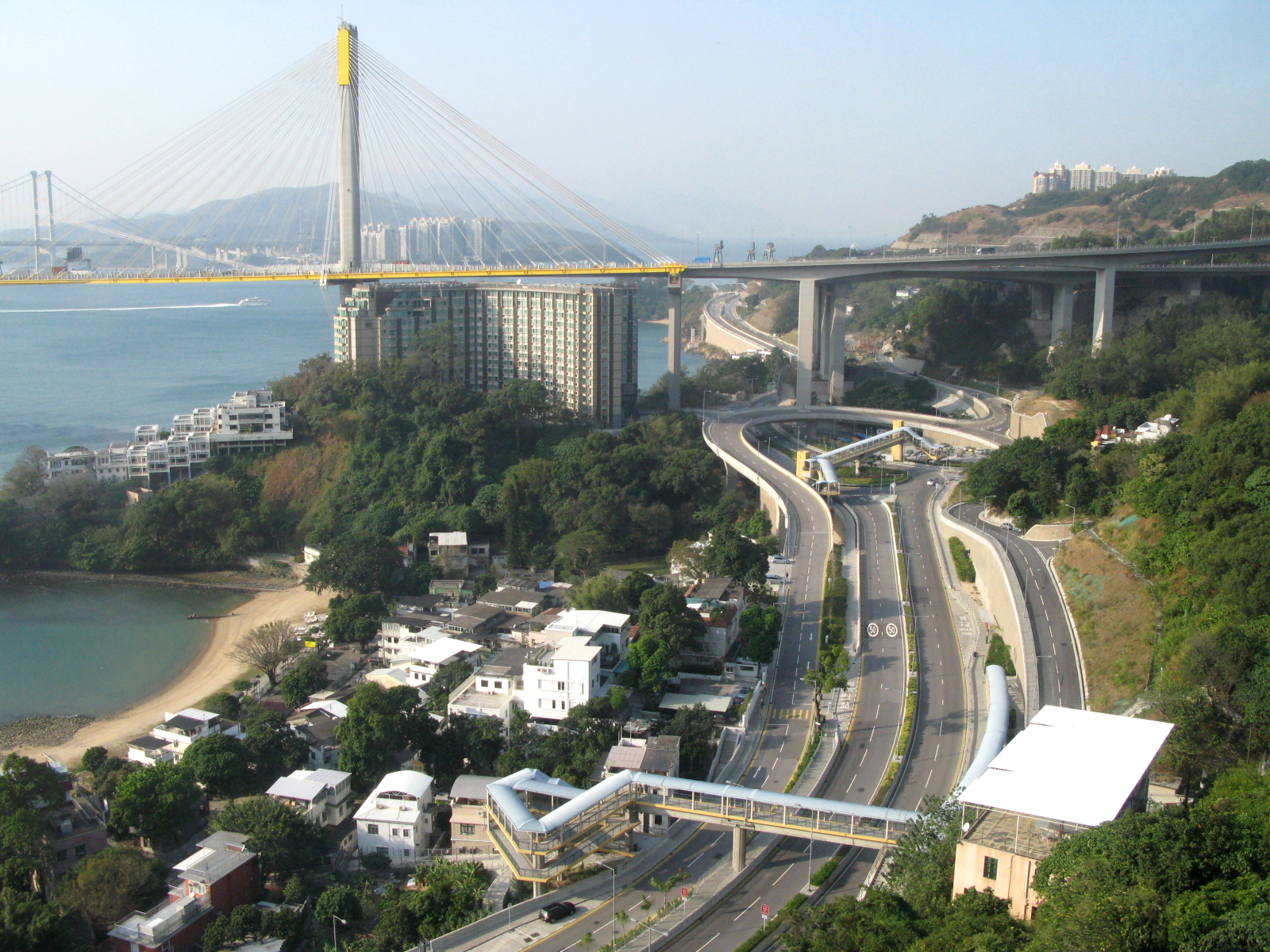
Ting Kau Village, Ting Kau Beach, Castle Peak Road and the Ting Kau Bridge.

Ting Kau Beach is a gazetted beach located at the northwest end of Victoria Harbour on Castle Peak Road in Ting Kau, New Territories, Hong Kong. The beach is managed by the Leisure and Cultural Services Department of the Hong Kong Government. The beach is rated as Grade 2 by the Environmental Protection Department for its water quality.

The beach, along with Approach Beach, is one of the only two gazetted beaches in Tsuen Wan District that can "swim in Victoria Harbour". It sits beside the northern abutment of the Ting Kau Bridge, and also offers views of the Tsing Ma Bridge.

== History ==
In 1977, the beach was gazetted by the Hong Kong Government and is located under Ting Kau Village. However, in 1995, the beaches in Tsuen Wan District were closed due to the construction of the nearby Ting Kau and Tsing Ma Bridges and no longer allowed the public to swim due to its poor water quality.

In 1997, a reading at the beach had revealed 1,500 counts of the bacteria per 100ml of water.

The beach has been reopened to the public for swimming since April 2014.

== Features ==
The beach has the following features:

- Changing rooms
- Showers
- Toilets

== See also ==
- Beaches of Hong Kong
