= Autotoll =

Hong Kong road toll agency

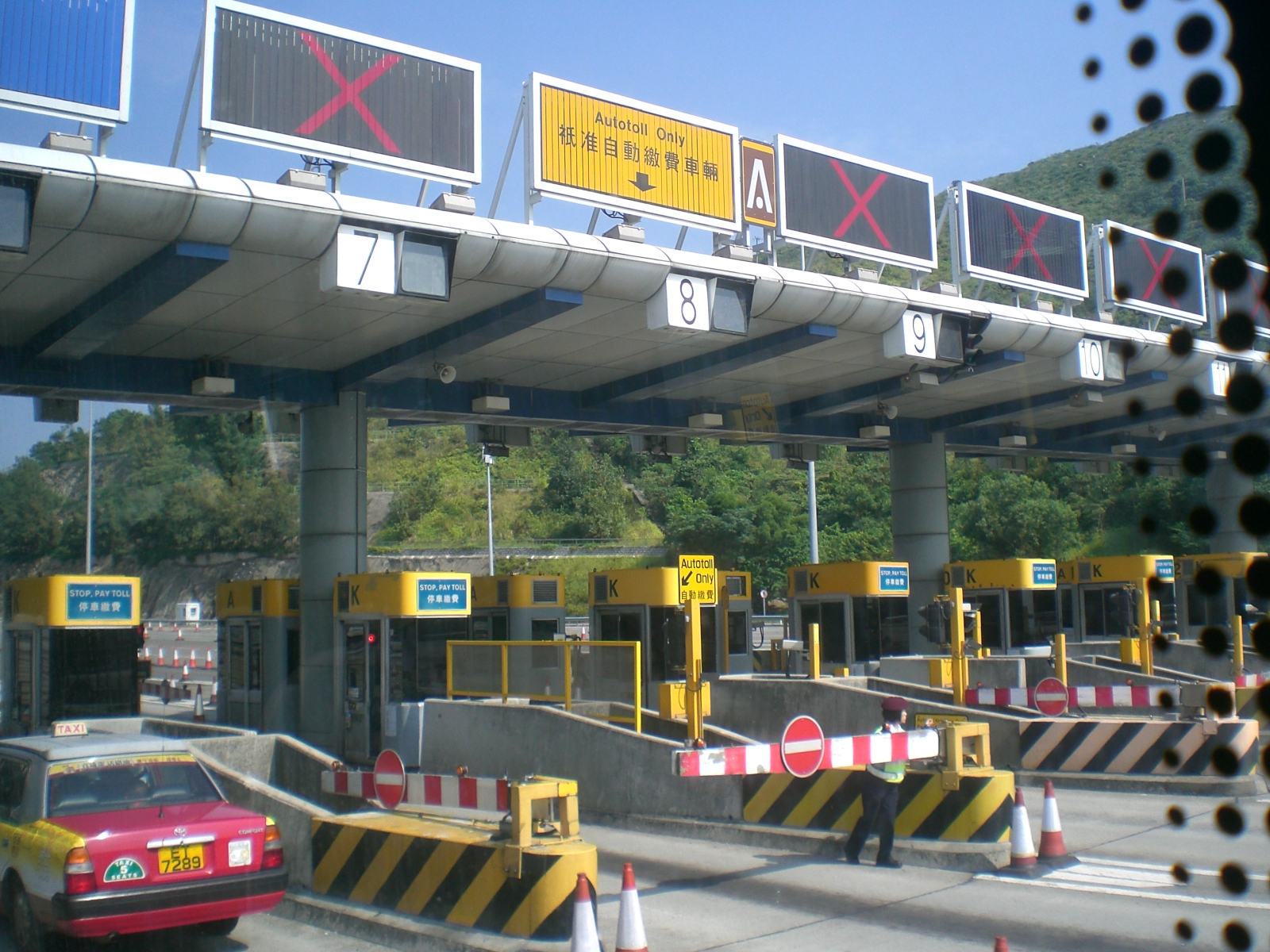
- Autotoll system
- Location: Hong Kong
- Launched: 1 October 1998
- Operator: Autotoll Limited
- Currency: Hong Kong dollar

Autotoll Limited provides electronic toll collection (ETC) service in Hong Kong.

== Introduction ==
Autotoll was established on 1 October 1998, through the merger of the two individual electronic toll collection systems by The Autopass Co. Ltd. and Electronic Toll Systems Ltd.

Autotoll is currently the only service provider of electronic toll collection in Hong Kong. Shareholders include Wilson Group Limited and The Cross-Harbour (Holdings) Ltd.

Similar with the electronic toll collection system in other countries, vehicles with Autotoll Tag can go straight and do not have to stop and pay cash at toll booths.

Autotoll is a pre-paid spending mode. An Autotoll account will be set up upon registration by drivers. A deposit of HK$150 for Autotoll Tag is required with the monthly administration fee of HK$35. When driving into tunnels or toll roads, the transponder communicates by RFID instantaneously with the device installed adjacent to the toll booth to pay the toll by deducting it from a pre-paid account. The pre-paid amount ranges from HK$500 to HK$3,000 according to different vehicle types.

Autotoll has launched the “AutoPark” service in 2006. Vehicles with Autotoll Tag can register “AutoPark” service for free and park at the designated carparks with the barrier gate rising automatically for driving in and out.

== History ==
In June 1992, The Autopass Co. Ltd. introduced the electronic toll collection system (ETC) to Hong Kong and conduct the first testing phase at The Aberdeen Tunnel. In August 1993, ETC system was installed at a few more crowded tunnels, including Cross-Harbour Tunnel, Eastern Harbour Crossing and Lion Rock Tunnel. The system further applied to Western Harbour Crossing in May 1997, Tai Lam Tunnel in June 1998 and Cheung Tsing tunnel in July 1998.

In September 1995, Electronic Toll Systems Ltd. had developed another electronic toll collection system. It was then installed at Tate's Cairn Tunnel for testing and further expended to Shing Mun Tunnels and Tseung Kwan O Tunnel in October 1997. This system is not compatible with the one from The Autopass Co. Ltd. Besides, the Lantau Link and Tai Lam Tunnel originally planned to use this system too. Due to the merger of these two systems in 1998, the system from The Autopass Co. Ltd. was used instead.

Since the two individual systems had brought inconvenience to motorists, the Autopass Co. Ltd. and Electronic Toll Systems Ltd. merged the systems on 1 October 1998 with the support from Hong Kong Government. And the system was renamed as Autotoll. The service continued at the 9 tunnels and 1 toll road and further expanded to Eagle's Nest Tunnel and Sha Tin Heights Tunnel.

Autotoll has launched the “AutoPark” service in 2006. Vehicles with Autotoll Tag can register “AutoPark” service for free and park at the designated carparks with the barrier gate rising automatically for driving in and out.

On 7 May 2023, the Transport Department has announced to implement HKeToll (Chinese: 易通行) to replace Autotoll in toll tunnels, so that toll booths can be demolished, after replacement, Autotoll will only serve HZMB toll station and, through AutoPark, the remain toll parking lots. The HKeToll system will continue be operated by Autotoll Limited.

== Roads with service ==
=== Current service ===
- Hong Kong–Zhuhai–Macau Bridge, from 24 October 2018

=== Former service ===
Used Autopass before October 1998

- Aberdeen Tunnel (Route 1), from June 1992 until 31 December 2023, replaced by HKeToll
- Lion Rock Tunnel (Route 1), from August 1993 until 28 May 2023, replaced by HKeToll
- Cross-Harbour Tunnel (Route 1), from August 1993 until 23 July 2023, replaced by HKeToll
- Eastern Harbour Crossing (Route 2), from August 1993 until 27 August 2023, replaced by HKeToll
- Western Harbour Crossing (Route 3), from 5 May 1997 until 6 August 2023, replaced by HKeToll
- Tai Lam Tunnel (Route 3), from June 1998 until 31 May 2025, replaced by HKeToll
- Lantau Link (Route 8), from July 1998 until 27 December 2020, now toll-free

Used Electronic Toll Systems before October 1998

- Tate's Cairn Tunnel (Route 2), from May 1996 until 26 November 2023, replaced by HKeToll
- Tseung Kwan O Tunnel (Route 7), from October 1997 until 11 December 2022, now toll-free
- Shing Mun Tunnels (Route 9), from October 1997 until 21 May 2023, replaced by HKeToll

Tunnels opened after October 1998

Eagle's Nest Tunnel and Sha Tin Heights Tunnel (Route 8), from March 2008 until 7 May 2023, replaced by HKeToll
