= Ting Kau =

Area in west Tsuen Wan District, Hong Kong

Coordinates: 22.36956°N 114.07907°E

- Chinese: 汀九
Transcriptions
Standard Mandarin
- Hanyu Pinyin: Tīng Jiǔ
Yue: Cantonese
- Jyutping: Ding1 gau2

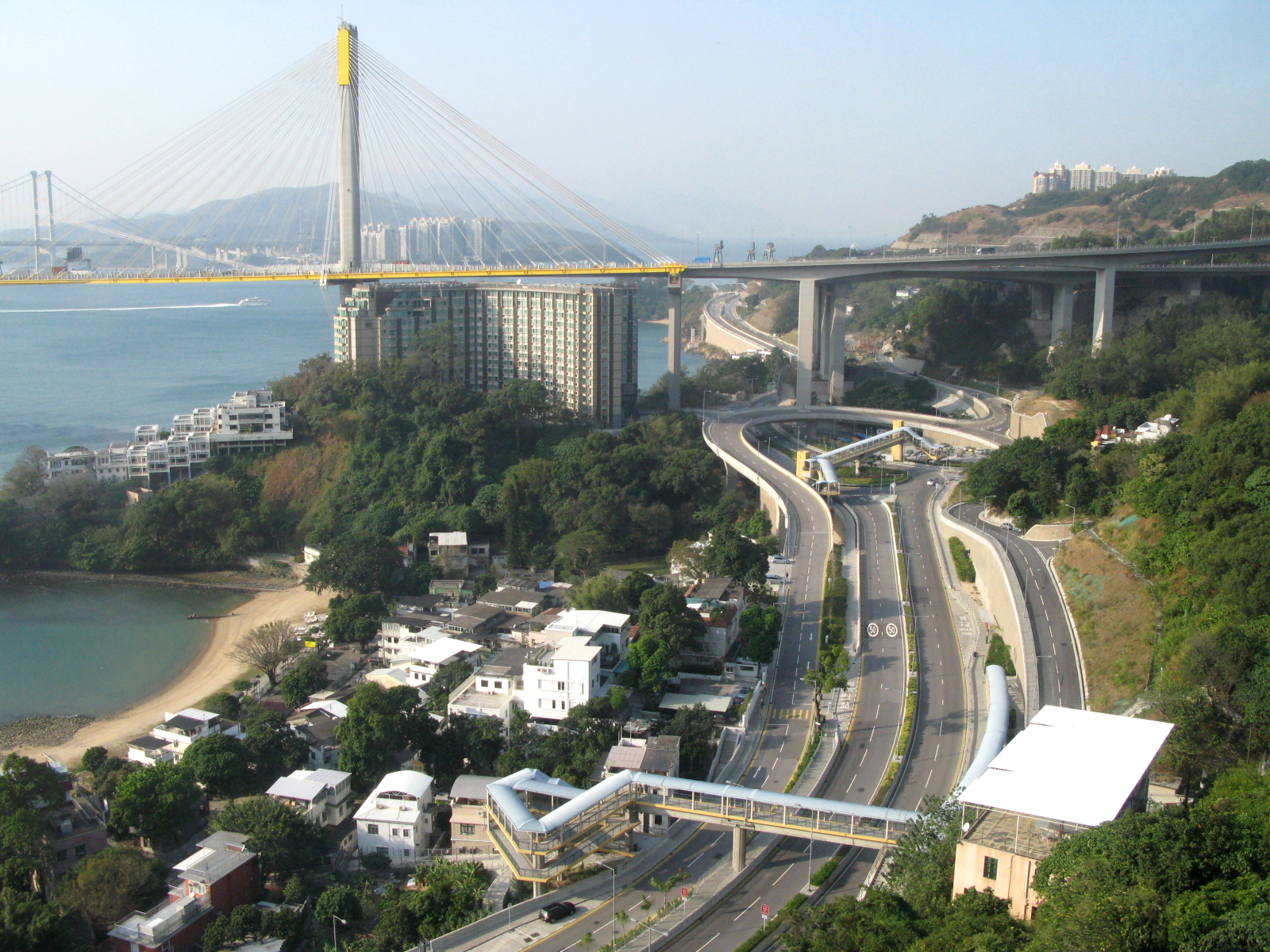
Ting Kau Village, Ting Kau Beach, Castle Peak Road and the Ting Kau Bridge.

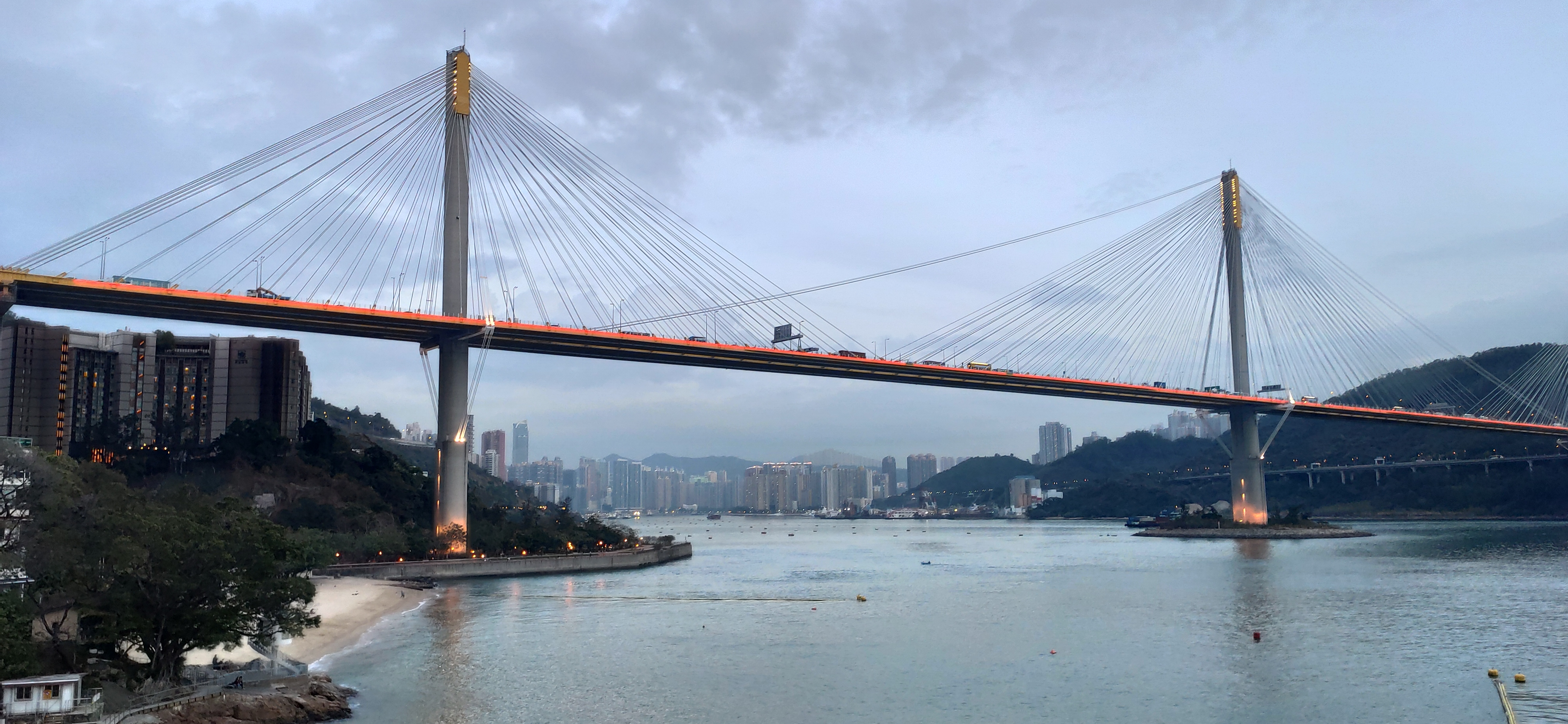
Ting Kau Bridge (2020).

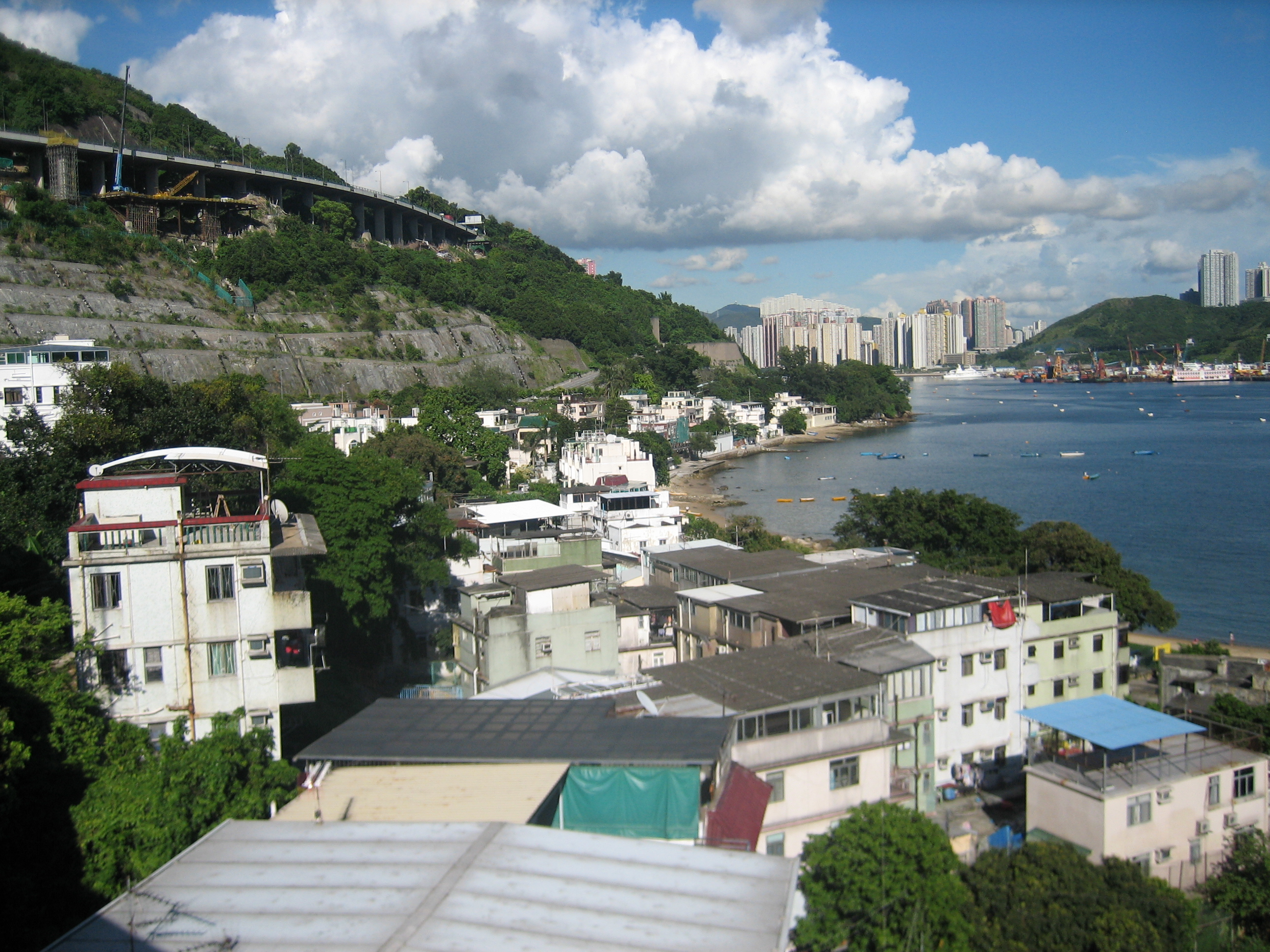
Ting Kau Village.

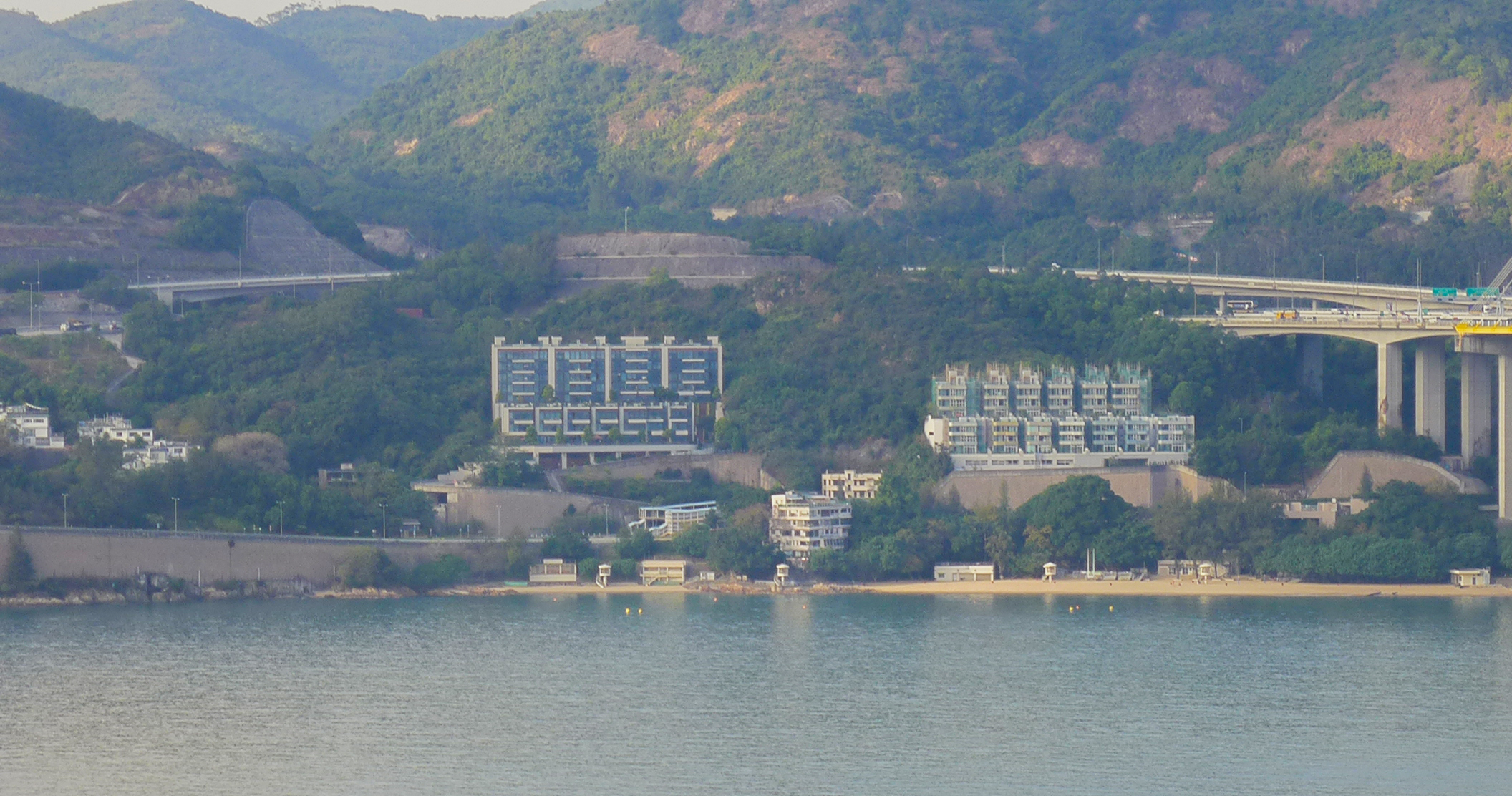
Casam Beach (left) and Lido Beach (right).

Ting Kau is an area in west Tsuen Wan District, New Territories, Hong Kong. Ting Kau Village (Chinese: 汀九村) is a village near the shore. Ting Kau is famous for the Ting Kau Bridge, spanning the Rambler Channel, from Ting Kau to Tsing Yi Island.

== Administration ==
Ting Kau is a recognized village under the New Territories Small House Policy.

== Beaches ==
- Approach Beach (近水灣泳灘)
- Casam Beach (更生灣泳灘)
- Hoi Mei Wan Beach (海美灣泳灘)
- Lido Beach (麗都灣泳灘)
- Ting Kau Beach (汀九灣泳灘) was once a popular beach in Hong Kong. The water quality affected by the treated water injected into Victoria Harbour.

== Private housing ==
- Golden Villa
- The Westminster Terrace

== Education ==
Ting Kau is in Primary One Admission (POA) School Net 62, which includes schools in Tsuen Wan and areas nearby. The net includes multiple aided schools and one government school, Hoi Pa Street Government Primary School.

== Transportation ==
Castle Peak Road is the main access to the area.

== See also ==
- Airport Core Programme Exhibition Centre
