= Shark net =

Submerged barrier that protects swimmers from shark attacks

Simplified diagram of shark net in New South Wales, Australia

A shark net is a submerged section of gillnets placed at beaches designed to intercept large marine animals including sharks, with the aim to reduce the likelihood of shark attacks on swimmers. The gillnets form a wall of netting that hangs in the water and captures the marine animals by entanglement.

Shark nets do not create an exclusion zone between sharks and humans, and are not to be confused with shark barriers.

Shark nets do not completely prevent shark attacks in the enclosed area, but work on the principle of "fewer sharks, fewer attacks". Specifically, they aim to reduce occurrence of attacks by entangling and via shark mortality. Shark nets such as those in New South Wales are designed to entangle and capture sharks that pass near them. Reducing the local shark populations reduces the chance of an attack.

Historical shark attack figures suggest that the use of shark nets and drumlines does markedly reduce the incidence of shark attack when implemented on a regular and consistent basis. However a 2019 study argued this conclusion overlooks key factors. The large mesh size of the nets is designed specifically to capture sharks and prevent their escape until eventually, they drown. Due to boating activity, the nets also float 4 metres or more below the surface and do not connect with the shoreline (excluding Hong Kong's shark barrier nets) thus allowing sharks the opportunity to swim over and around nets. Shark nets can cost approximately A$20,000 per beach per year.

Shark nets have been criticized by environmentalists, conservationists and animal rights activists — they say shark nets are unethical and harm the marine ecosystem. They also argue there is no science showing that nets make the ocean safer for people. Only around 10% of catch in shark nets is the intended target shark species.

Shark nets vary in size. The nets in Queensland, Australia, are typically 186m long, set at a depth of 6m, have a mesh size of 500mm and are designed to catch sharks longer than 2m in length. The nets in New South Wales, Australia, are typically 150m long, set on the sea floor, extending approximately 6m up the water column, are designed to catch sharks longer than 2m in length.

== History ==
Shark net meshing was developed by the New South Wales Fisheries in 1937, after a decade and a half of repeated shark attacks off Sydney beaches. In March 1935, for example, two people — one at North Narrabeen and one at Maroubra — perished after great white shark attacks in a single week. The meshing was never designed to enclose a piece of water, as barrier nets couldn't survive a surf zone. Instead, it was designed to catch large sharks as they swam within range of the surf. At first, the catch was huge; over 600 sharks in the first year of operation, off just a few Sydney beaches. But over time, even without adjusting for the spread of the program across almost all Sydney beaches and into Wollongong and Newcastle, the catch declined. Today's New South Wales meshing annual average catch is 143 sharks, many of which are released alive.

Nets were first deployed off certain beaches in KwaZulu-Natal (formerly Natal), South Africa, in 1952.

Shark nets were also used off Dunedin, New Zealand for roughly 40 years, and were removed in 2011. The nets were found to be detrimental to the environment; 700 non-target species were killed. No shark attacks have occurred since their removal.

As of 2018, shark nets are used in New South Wales, Queensland and KwaZulu-Natal. In August 2018, it was announced that the nets in northern New South Wales would be removed, but that the nets in Sydney, Newcastle and Wollongong would stay. The New South Wales Green party said they wanted all shark nets removed.

== Effectiveness ==
Ongoing shark control programs have been very successful in reducing the incidence of shark attack at the protected beaches. In the years from 1900 to 1937, 13 people died off New South Wales surf beaches after shark attacks; over the next 72 years, the death rate fell to eight, only one of which was at a meshed beach. This in a period when the New South Wales human population rose from 1.4 million to seven million — and when more people began going to the beach.

In Queensland, there has been only one fatal attack on a controlled beach since 1962, compared to 27 fatal attacks between 1919 and 1961. Statistics from the New South Wales Department of Primary Industries indicate that before nets were introduced in New South Wales in 1936 there was an average of one fatal shark attack every year. There has been only one fatal attack on a protected beach since then and that was in 1951. Similarly, between 1943 and 1951 the South African city of Durban experienced seven fatal attacks but there have been none since nets were introduced in 1952. A more recent comparison shows that in South Africa there were three shark attacks, none fatal, at protected beaches in KwaZulu-Natal between 1990 and 2011, while there were 20 fatal attacks in the same period at unprotected beaches in the Eastern and Western Cape Provinces.

However, the net program in New South Wales has been called "outdated and ineffective" by environmental groups; they argue that shark nets do not protect swimmers. 65% of shark attacks in New South Wales occurred at netted beaches.

== Environmental impact ==
Shark nets result in incidence of bycatch, including threatened and endangered species like sea turtles, dugongs, dolphins and whales. In Queensland in the 2011/12 summer season there were 700 sharks caught, 290 above 4 metres in shark nets and drum lines.

In New South Wales, the meshing averages one humpback whale every two years; the whale is almost always released alive. In Queensland in 2015, the bycatch included one bottlenose and seven common dolphin (one released alive), 11 catfish, eight cow-nose rays, nine eagle rays, 13 loggerhead turtles, five manta rays (all but one survived), eight shovelnose rays, three toadfish, four tuna, and a white spotted eagle, which was safely released.

New South Wales and Queensland also utilize acoustic pingers attached to the nets to reduce bycatch of dolphins, whales and other marine mammals. Use of the pingers has been shown to significantly reduce marine mammal bycatch.

The current net program in New South Wales has been described as being "extremely destructive" to marine life. Between September 2017 and April 2018, more than 403 animals perished in the nets in New South Wales, including 10 critically endangered grey nurse sharks, 7 dolphins, 7 green sea turtles and 14 great white sharks. Between 1950 and 2008, 352 tiger sharks and 577 great white sharks died in the nets in New South Wales — also during this period, a total of 15,135 marine animals perished in the nets. More than 5,000 marine turtles have been caught on the nets. The New South Wales government prohibits people from rescuing entangled animals — this prohibition has been called "heartless and cruel".

In a 30-year period, more than 33,000 sharks have perished in KwaZulu-Natal's shark net program. During the same 30-year period, 2,211 turtles, 8,448 rays, and 2,310 dolphins died in KwaZulu-Natal's shark net program.

== Controversy ==
The continued use of shark nets has generated debate between those prioritising swimmer safety and those opposing the ecological toll of the programs.

Shark nets do not create a complete barrier, as they extend only a few metres below the surface and can be bypassed by sharks swimming over or around them. Following a fatal shark attack at a netted Sydney beach in 2025, researcher Chris Pepin-Neff described the nets as “like throwing a napkin into the pool.”

A 2025 review by the New South Wales Threatened Species Scientific Committee found no measurable evidence that the presence of nets significantly reduced shark-bite incidents compared with non-netted beaches.

Political scientist Christopher Neff notes, "Internationally, shark nets have been labeled a 'key threatening process' for killing endangered species." He adds: " ... killing endangered species to boost public confidence or to show government action is not workable. It is a disservice to the public." Jessica Morris of Humane Society International calls shark nets a "knee-jerk reaction" and says, "sharks are top order predators that play an important role in the functioning of marine ecosystems. We need them for healthy oceans." Sea World Research & Rescue Foundation also oppose the use of shark nets to cull shark populations "In an ideal world we would like for there to be no culling of sharks in Australia and around the world however, this is not a reality. We understand the pressure on governments to protect swimmers through the use of shark control programs. We continue our stance against shark nets and maintain our rescue operations to save dolphins, whales, turtles that become entrapped within them, along with working with the authoritative agencies to research improved methods which will lessen the impact on our marine life".

Animal welfare groups note the suffering and cruelty that nets inflict upon animals, such as lacerations, stress, pain, and disease. They suggest alternatives such as surf lifesaving patrols, public education on shark behaviour, radio signals, sonar technology and electric nets.

While most environmental groups call for the nets’ removal, some commentators argue that their ecological harm is overstated. Australian surf journalist Nick Carroll wrote in The Telegraph that the impact of shark nets “is less than commonly thought” and that their safety benefits for swimmers and surfers outweigh the environmental cost.

His arguments have been contested by marine scientists and conservation organisations, who cite government bycatch data and maintain that non-lethal deterrents can provide equivalent safety without the same ecological toll.

Comparisons with commercial fishing are also cited in debate. On average 15 Great white sharks are caught by the NSW and Queensland shark control programme each year, compared to 186 caught in Australia from other activities. Australia's commercial shark fishing industry is catching over 1200 tonne of shark each year, of which 130 are Great white sharks. The NSW prawn trawling industry alone results in 64 tonne of shark as bycatch each year, with two thirds dying. Tuna and swordfish longline fishing off the coast of South Africa reported 39,000 to 43,000 sharks died each year between 1995 and 2005. Sharksavers estimates that in total 50 million sharks are caught unintentionally each year as bycatch by the commercial fishing industry.

Plans by the New South Wales government to trial the removal of shark nets from selected beaches were paused in 2025 after a fatal attack, citing safety concerns while investigations continued. Several local councils and conservation groups continue to advocate replacing nets with modern technologies such as SMART drumline systems, drones, and acoustic monitoring networks.

== Cost ==
Total cost for the Shark netting program in NSW for the 2009/10 year was approximately AUD $1m, which included the cost of the nets, contractors, observers and shark technician, shark meshing equipment (dolphin pingers and whale alarms etc.), and compliance audit activities. For the 51 beaches protected, this represents a financial cost of approximately AUD$20,000 per beach per year.

== Australia ==
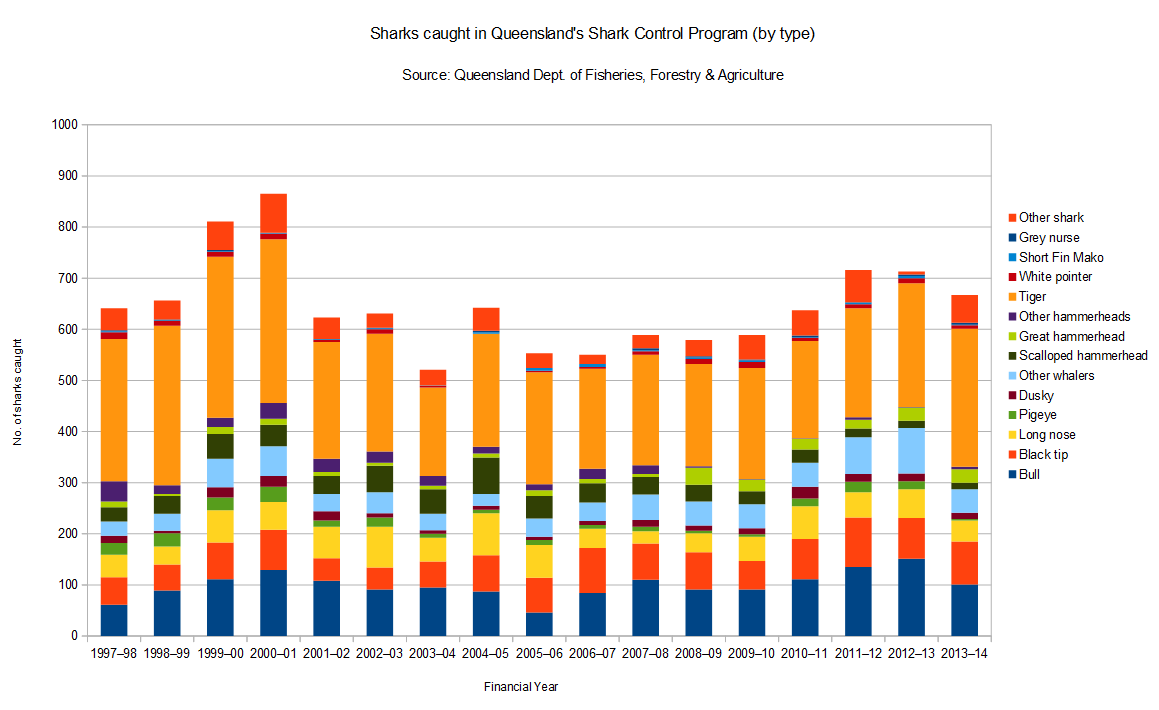
Graph of sharks caught in Queensland's Shark Control Program (by type) July 1997- June 2014

In New South Wales, Australia, 51 beaches are netted. The nets are maintained by the New South Wales Department of Primary Industries. The nets are generally 150 metres long, 6 m wide and "bottom-set" on the seabed in depths of 10 m. The nets can be 500 metres from the beach. The mesh is sized 50–60 centimetres. Nets are lifted every 24 to 48 hours for servicing so as to prevent rotting, to clean out debris and to remove dead sharks and other marine life. It is said that 35–50% of the sharks are entangled from the beach side. Acoustic "pingers" have been fitted to the nets to warn off dolphins and whales and the nets are not in place in winter, the whale migration season. The department states that the nets have "never been regarded as a means of absolutely preventing any attacks", but help to deter sharks from establishing territories. From 1950 to 2008, hundreds of great white sharks and tiger sharks perished in the nets in New South Wales.

In Queensland, Australia, drum lines are used in combination with shark nets. Queensland's Shark Control Program has been in place since the early 1960s. In Queensland's 2011/12 summer season there were 714 sharks caught, 281 above 2 metres in shark nets and drum lines. Since 1997, 500-900 sharks perished annually in the program, including several shark species of conservation concern. They include the following:

Common name	Scientific name	IUCN Redlist status	EPBC conservation listing (AUS)
Great hammerhead	Sphyrna mokarran	Endangered	
Great white shark	Carcharodon carcharias	Vulnerable	Vulnerable
Grey nurse shark	Carcharias taurus	Vulnerable	Critically Endangered (East Coast) Population
Scalloped hammerhead	Sphyrna lewini	Endangered	

A fatal attack in Queensland occurred in January 2006 at Amity Point on North Stradbroke Island. The water at this location drops off to 30 metres depth, and bull sharks are known to frequent the area. Drum lines were installed at beaches around the island at the time. Another shark attack occurred at Greenmount Beach on the Gold Coast in 2020. Drumlines and shark nets were installed at the beach at this time.

Following a fatal attack in 2025 on one of Sydney's northern beaches, the state government paused plans for removal of shark nets from three beaches.

== South Africa ==
In South Africa, shark nets are installed at numerous beaches in KwaZulu-Natal by the KwaZulu-Natal Sharks Board. Shark nets have been installed in KwaZulu-Natal since the 1950s and have greatly reduced the number of shark attacks along the beaches where they are installed. However more than 33,000 sharks have perished in KwaZulu-Natal's nets in a 30-year period. KwaZulu-Natal's shark net program has been called "archaic" and "disastrous to the ecosystem".

== See also ==
- Drum line
- Shark attack prevention
- Shark Shield
- Shark proof cage
- Shark culling
