= Tai Lam Tunnel Bus Interchange =

Coordinates: 22°25′15.5″N 114°03′49.3″E

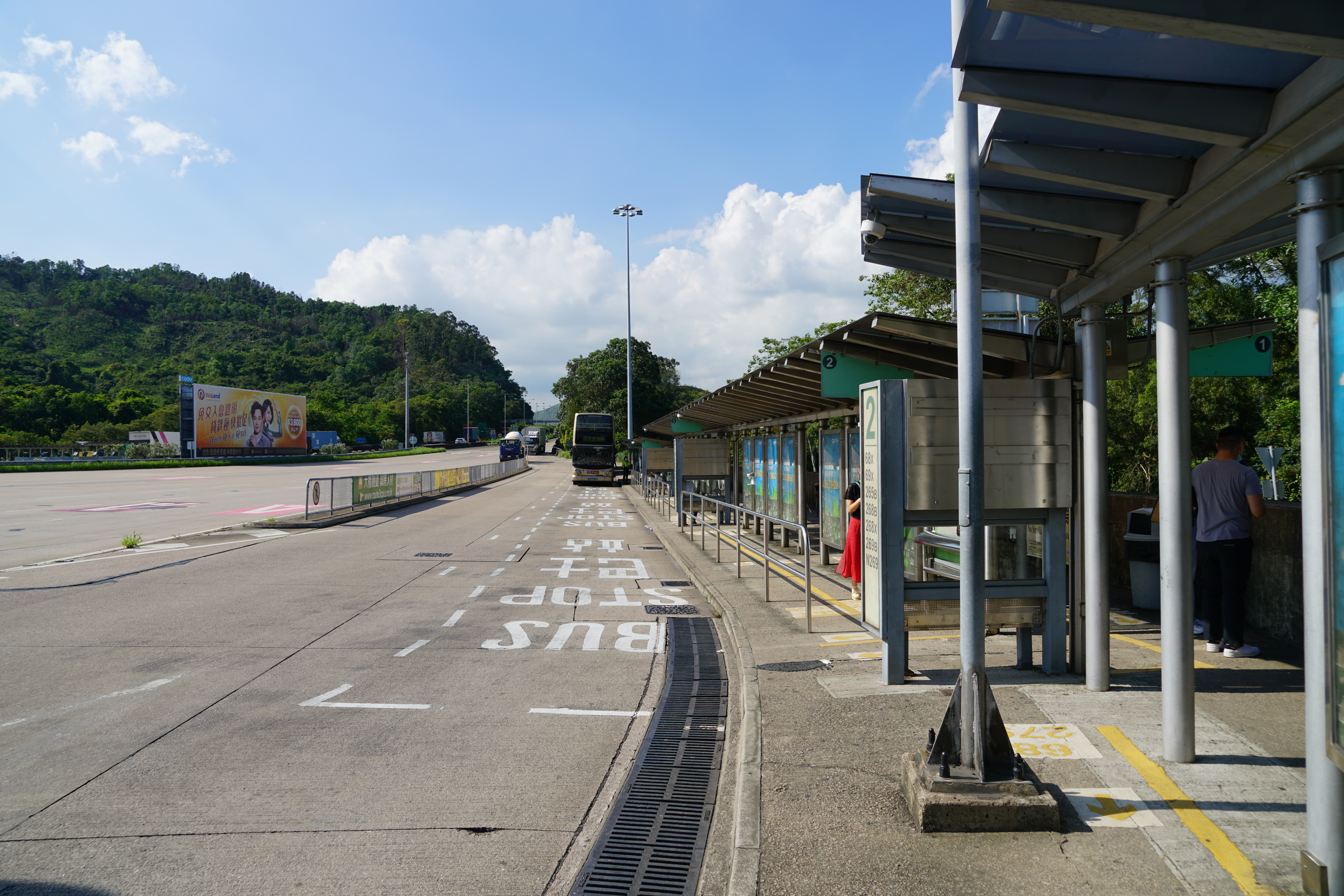
Tai Lam Tunnel Bus Interchange.

Tai Lam Tunnel Bus Interchange (Chinese: 大欖隧道轉車站), abbreviated as TLTBI, is a major bus interchange near Kam Tin, Hong Kong. It is at the northern exit of Tai Lam Tunnel, near Kam Sheung Road station.

In the fourth quarter of 2022, the average daily patronage at TLTBI was about 19,800 passengers.
