= Airport Core Programme Exhibition Centre =

Building in Hong Kong

Coordinates: 22°21′50.76″N 114°4′13.64″E

- Traditional Chinese: 機場核心計劃展覽中心
- Simplified Chinese: 机场核心计划展览中心
Transcriptions
Standard Mandarin
- Hanyu Pinyin: Jīchǎng Héxīn Jìhuà Zhǎnlǎn Zhōngxīn
Yue: Cantonese
- Yale Romanization: Gēi chèuhng haht sām gai waahk jín láahm jūng sām
- Jyutping: Gei1 coeng4 hat6 sam1 gai3 waak6 zin2 laam5 zung1 sam1

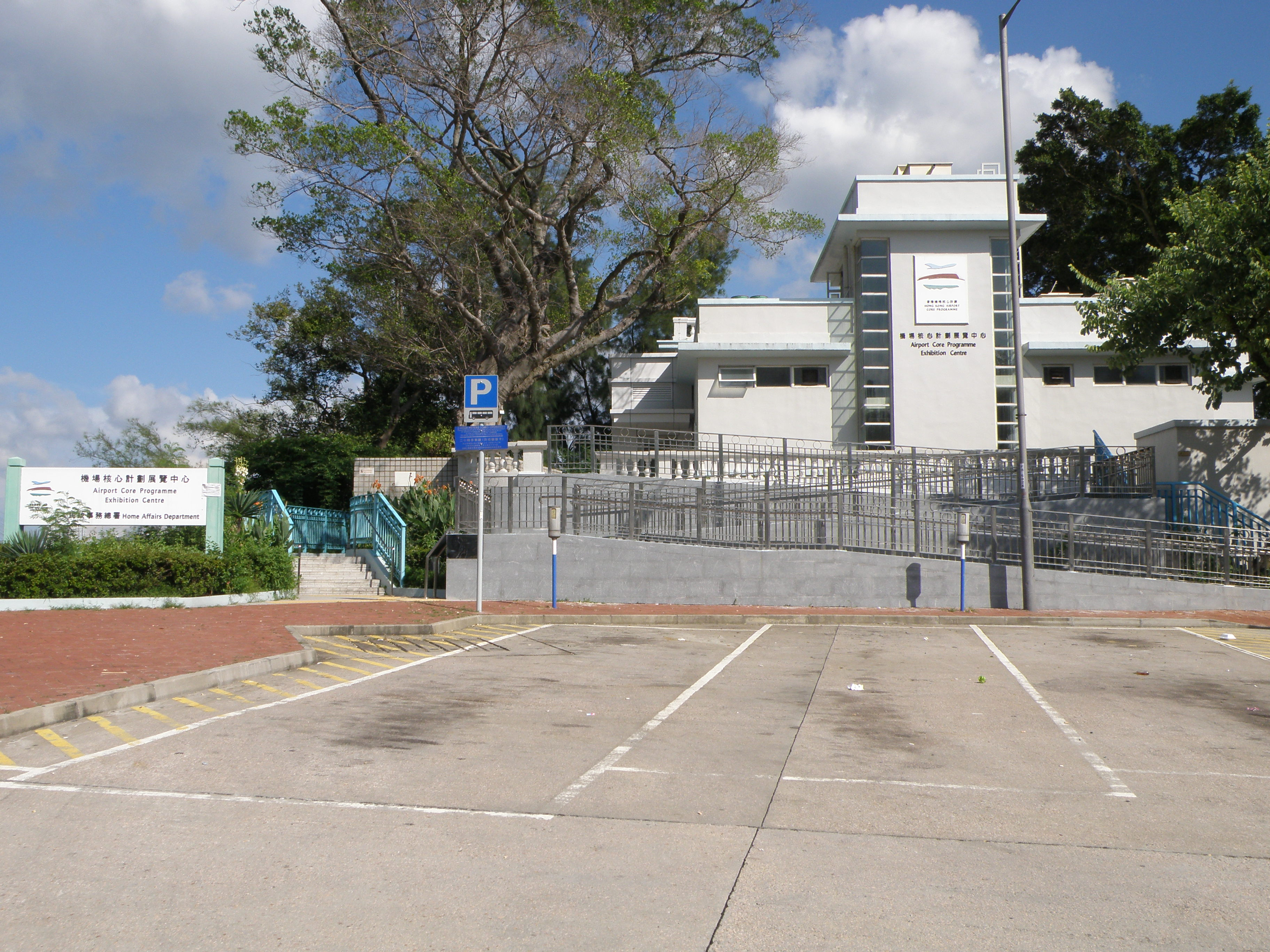
Airport Core Programme Exhibition Centre

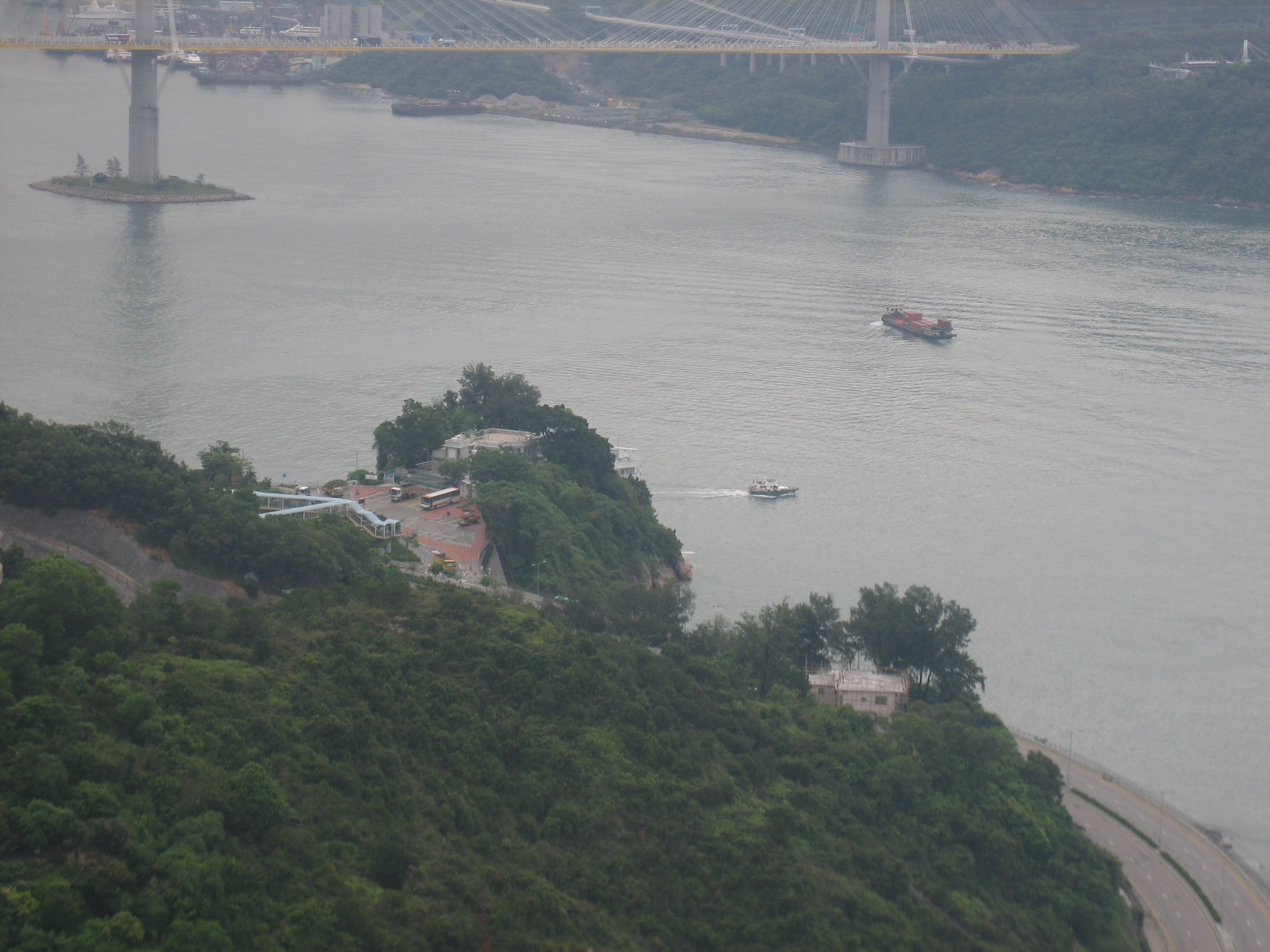
Airport Core Programme Exhibition Centre seen from the Bellagio private housing estate. The bridge in the background is the Ting Kau Bridge.

The Airport Core Programme Exhibition Centre was housed in a single-storey distinctive white structure situated at 401 Castle Peak Road, Ting Kau, New Territories in Hong Kong. The exhibition centre was run by the Home Affairs Department for the Airport Core Programme, often referred to as the Rose Garden Project.

== History ==
The building was originally named Homi Villa, it was built by a private developer, Jehangir H. Ruttonjee, in the early 1930s. It was later bought by the Hong Kong Government and used as staff quarters for British army officers. For example, it served as the residence of Sir Philip Haddon-Cave, the Financial Secretary between 1971 and 1982.

It was converted into the Airport Core Programme Exhibition Centre in 1995 by the New Airport Projects Co-ordination Office (NAPCO), it opened in early 1996. During the first six months of operation 100,000 people visited the centre, with weekends averaging more than 2,000 visitors. To help contend with the popularity opening hours were extended to public holidays.

As the Airport Core Programme was completed in 1998 with the opening of the Hong Kong International Airport, the exhibition centre has been closed down since 3 January 2025.

== Facilities ==
There are five exhibition areas, displaying models, photos and descriptions of the 10 airport-related projects to give a full picture of the entire construction project of the Hong Kong International Airport.

Permanently mounted rooftop binoculars are available for visitors to view Tsing Ma Bridge which links Tsing Yi on the east to Ma Wan on the west, crossing Ma Wan Channel. It is part of the Lantau Link which, with three long span bridges, links the New Territories and Chek Lap Kok, where the Hong Kong International Airport is located.

== See also ==
- Lantau Link Visitors Centre
