= Shing Mun Tunnels Bus Interchange =

Shing Mun Tunnels Bus Interchange 城門隧道轉車站
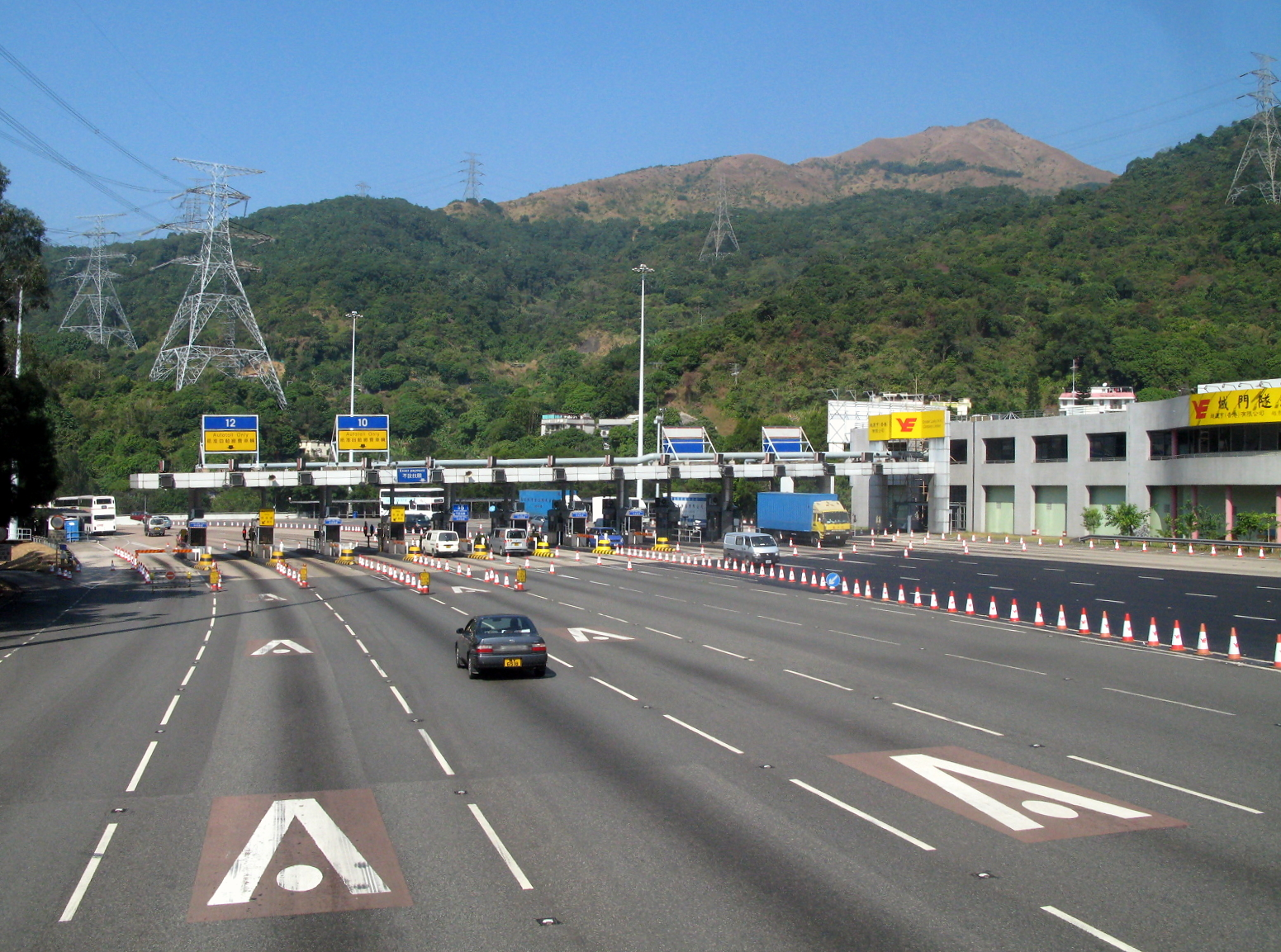
- The interchange is located next to the toll plaza

General information
- Location: Shing Mun Tunnels, Tsuen Wan; Hong Kong

History
- Opened: 26 May 1991

Shing Mun Tunnels Bus Interchange (Chinese: 城門隧道轉車站) is a major bus interchange in Hong Kong. Most bus routes that span Sha Tin and Tai Wai and Tsuen Wan, Kwai Chung, and Tsing Yi pass through Shing Mun Tunnels and make a stop at the bus interchange.
