= Drainage Services Department =

Hong Kong government department

- 渠務署

Government department overview
- Formed: 1989
- Headquarters: Revenue Tower; No. 5 Gloucester Road, Wan Chai
- Employees: 2,064 (March 2022)
- Annual budget: HK$3,447 million 2022-23 FY
- Government department executive: Alice Pang, from 4 Nov. 2020, Director of Drainage Services
- Website: dsd.gov.hk

Drainage Services Department
- Traditional Chinese: 渠務署
- Simplified Chinese: 渠务署
Transcriptions
Standard Mandarin
- Hanyu Pinyin: Qú Wù Shǔ
Yue: Cantonese
- Jyutping: keoi4 mou6 cyu5

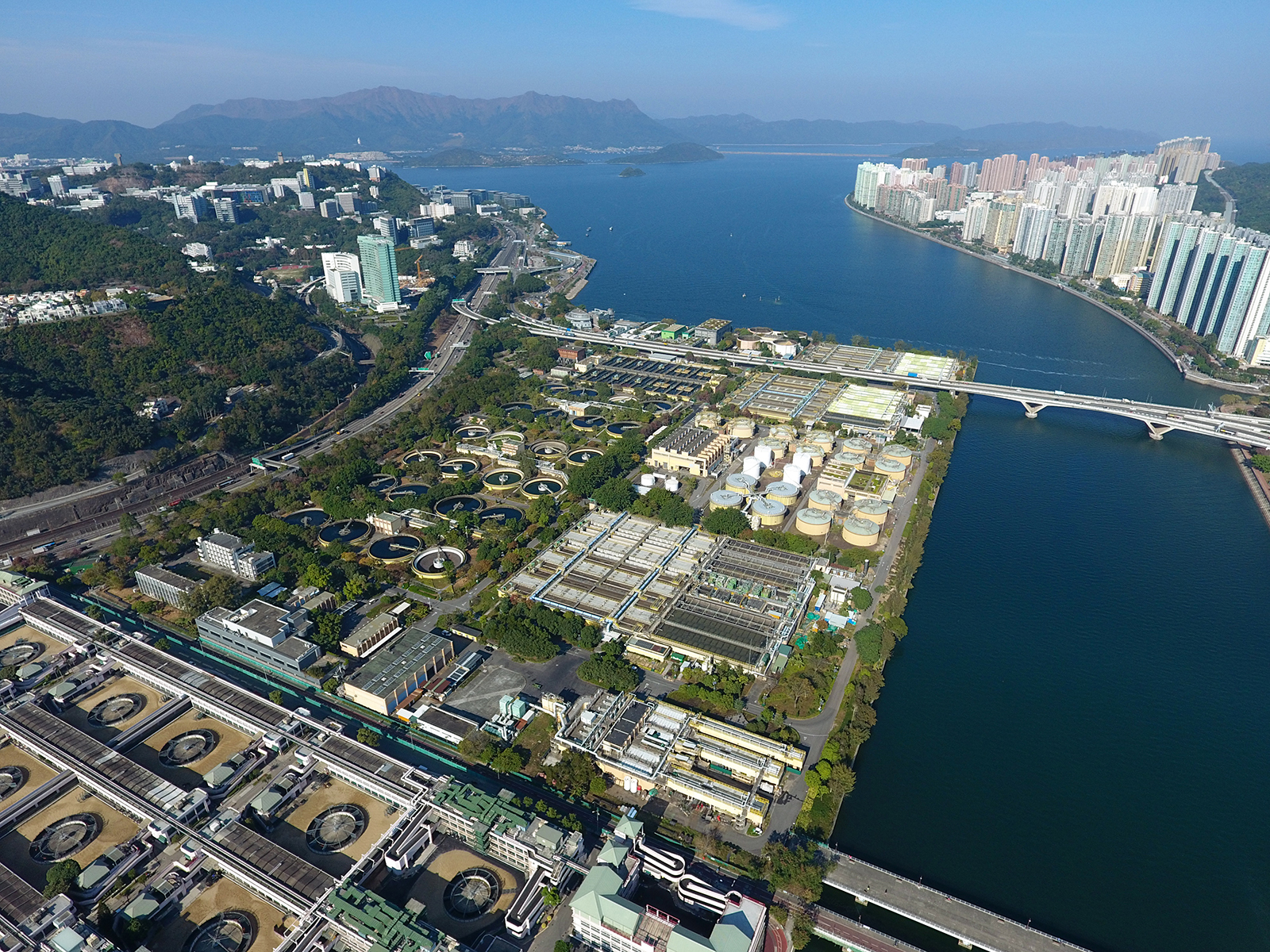
The Sha Tin Sewage Treatment Works.

The Drainage Services Department (DSD) is a department of the Hong Kong Government responsible for drainage and sewerage. Since 2007 it has been subordinate to the Development Bureau.

== Responsibilities ==
The department is responsible for stormwater drainage, sewage collection and treatment, and flood prevention.

== History ==
Environmental protection was one of the main concerns of former governor David Wilson. Wilson stressed the importance of better planning, increased control of pollution discharges, and large-scale investment in improved sewage disposal infrastructure. He stated that Hong Kong needed more treatment facilities and new outfalls constructed sufficiently far out to sea, and promoted a new department to help achieve this. The Drainage Services Department was established in 1989.

== Major infrastructure works ==
=== Harbour Area Treatment Scheme ===
The Harbour Area Treatment Scheme (HATS) is a major sewage treatment infrastructure improvement scheme designed to improve the water quality of Victoria Harbour. Originally called the Strategic Sewage Disposal Scheme, the plan was drawn up in 1989 and construction of HATS Stage 1 commenced in 1994. It comprises a system of deep tunnels to convey sewage from eight Preliminary Treatment Works to the Stonecutters Island Sewage Treatment Works, which opened in 1997. The full Stage I system, which treats 75% of the sewage generated by the urban areas around the harbour, came online in December 2001. Construction of HATS Stage 2 commenced in 2008, and stage 2A was commissioned in 2015. HATS Stage 2B, comprising an underground biological treatment facility at Stonecutters Island, has been shelved as it is felt that the existing facility is sufficient at this time.

=== Drainage tunnels ===
The department has built several significant bored tunnels designed to intercept water running down mountain slopes and divert it from urban areas in order to prevent flooding.

The largest of these is the Hong Kong West Drainage Tunnel, comprising an 11-kilometre long main tunnel and 8 km of adits. It stretches from Tai Hang in the east to an outfall just north of Cyberport. It was built at a cost of HK$3.4 billion. Construction commenced in November 2007 and the tunnel was commissioned on 22 August 2012.

The Lai Chi Kok Drainage Tunnel encircles Sham Shui Po and Lai Chi Kok. It is a 3.7-kilometre tunnel, stretching from Shek Kip Mei to an outfall near Stonecutters Island, built at a cost of $1.7 billion. Construction commenced in November 2008 and the tunnel was commissioned on 18 October 2012.

The Tsuen Wan Drainage Tunnel protects the Tsuen Wan New Town and Kwai Chung areas. The 5.1-kilometre tunnel begins at Wo Yi Hop, north of Kwai Chung, and curves around the north of Tsuen Wan proper. Past Chai Wan Kok, it parallels the Tuen Mun Highway a short distance and then empties into the Rambler Channel. Construction of the $1.5 billion tunnel commenced in 2007. It was commissioned on 28 March 2013.

== Vessels ==
The department operates two sludge transport vessels, called Clean Harbour 1 and Clean Harbour 2. These ships transport sludge from the Stonecutters Island Sewage Treatment Works to the sludge treatment facility in Tuen Mun.

The ships are equipped with gantry cranes capable of lifting sludge from the lorries directly into containers on board, and can lift 10 containers per hour. Each ship can carry 90 containers of sludge, a total of 1,200 tons of sludge. The vessels were built by Jinhui Shipbuilding of Zhongshan and commissioned in 2015.

=== Clean Harbour 1 ===
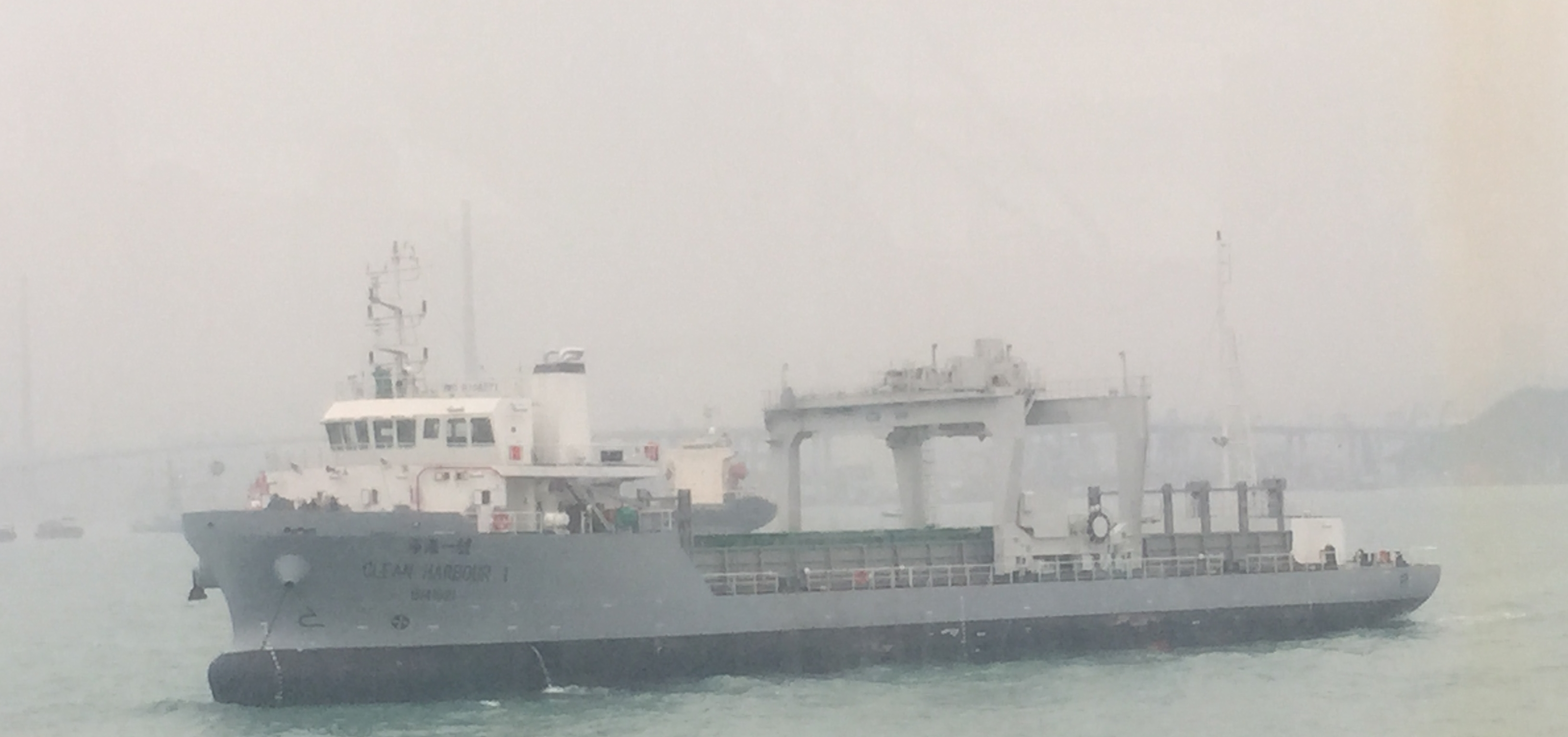
Clean Harbour 1

- Category: container ship
- Maritime Mobile Service Identification Number: 477 995 437
- IMO No: 9708277
- Official number: HK-4292
- Callsign: VROH7
- Net Tonnage: 657 tons
- Gross tonnage: 1971 tons
- Commissioning date: 5 March 2015

=== Clean Harbour 2 ===
- Category: container ship
- Maritime Mobile Service Identification Number: 477 995 441
- IMO No: 9708289
- Official number: HK-4305
- Callsign: VROJ4
- Net Tonnage: 657 tons
- Gross tonnage: 1971 tons
- Commissioning date: 5 March 2015
