= List of channels in Hong Kong =

List of channels, straits and passages in Hong Kong

Name	Description
Aberdeen Channel	Between Ap Lei Chau and Nam Long Shan on the Hong Kong Island
Adamasta Channel	Between the Chi Ma Wan Peninsula of Lantau Island and Cheung Chau island
East Lamma Channel	Between the western shores of Hong Kong Island and Ap Lei Chau, and the east side of Lamma Island
Fat Tong Mun	Between the southern tip of Clear Water Bay Peninsula and the northern tip of Tung Lung Chau
Kap Shui Mun	Between Lantau Island and Ma Wan
Lantau Channel	South of Fan Lau Kok of Lantau Island
Lei Yue Mun	Separates Kowloon and Hong Kong Island, between Junk Bay and Victoria Harbour
Ma Wan Channel	Between Ma Wan and Tsing Yi Island
Rambler Channel	Between Tsing Yi Island and the Tsuen Wan and Kwai Chung areas of Kowloon Peninsula
Sulphur Channel	Between Green Island and the northwest tip of Hong Kong Island
Tathong Channel	Bounded by Junk Island (Fat Tong Chau) and Tung Lung Chau in the east, and Hong Kong Island in the west
Tolo Channel	South of Plover Cove, connecting Tolo Harbour to Mirs Bay
Urmston Road	Between Lantau Island and Tuen Mun
West Lamma Channel	

== See also ==
- List of islands and peninsulas of Hong Kong
- List of places in Hong Kong
- List of buildings and structures in Hong Kong
