= Ma Wan Tung Wan Beach =

Beach in Ma Wan, New Territories, Hong Kong

- Beach
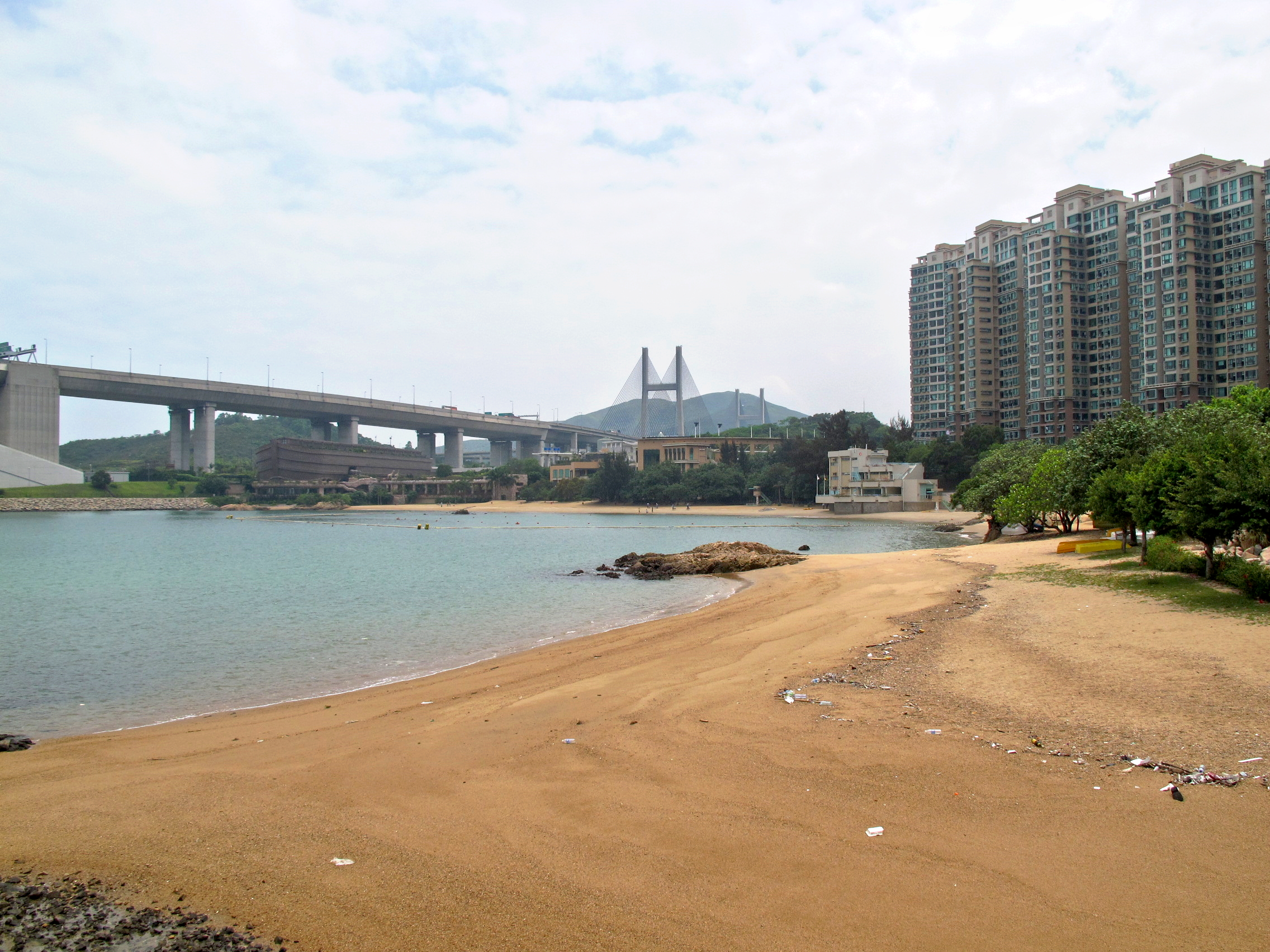
- Ma Wan Tung Wan Beach

- Location within Hong Kong
- Coordinates: 22.35023°N 114.06153°E
- Location: Ma Wan, New Territories

Dimensions
  - Length: 140 m (460 ft)
- Patrolled by: Leisure and Cultural Services Department

Ma Wan Tung Wan Beach
- Traditional Chinese: 馬灣東灣泳灘
- Simplified Chinese: 马湾东湾泳滩
Transcriptions
Standard Mandarin
- Hanyu Pinyin: Mǎ Wān Dōng Wān Yǒng Tān
Yue: Cantonese
- Jyutping: maa5 waan1 dung1 waan1 wing6 taan1

Ma Wan Tung Wan Beach is a gazetted beach near Noah's Ark on Ma Wan island, Hong Kong. The beach is managed by the Leisure and Cultural Services Department of the Hong Kong Government. The beach is 140 metres long and is rated as Grade 4 by the Environmental Protection Department for its water quality. It is the only gazetted beach in Ma Wan and offers views of Ting Kau Bridge as well as Tsing Ma Bridge.

== History ==
In 1991, the beach was gazetted by the Hong Kong Government and was officially opened in May 1993. However, in 1995, the beaches in Tsuen Wan District were closed due to the construction of the nearby Ting Kau and Tsing Ma Bridges and no longer allowed the public to swim due to its poor water quality. In 2001, when the water quality of Tung Wan in Ma Wan had gradually improved, the Leisure and Cultural Services Department had decided to reopen the beach. It was the only beach in Tsuen Wan that was officially approved for swimming from 2001 to 2011.

Since Park Island, a housing estate near Tung Wan in Ma Wan, was completed in 2002, the use of beaches had increased significantly, and it had become a good place for residents of this housing estate in summer.

== Usage ==
The beach is a flat stretch of fine golden sand with superb views of Tsing Ma and Ting Kau Bridges as well as passing ships.

== Features ==
The beach has the following features:

- Changing rooms
- Showers
- Toilets

== See also ==
- Beaches of Hong Kong
