= Urmston Road =

Broad body of water between Lantau Island and Tuen Mun in Hong Kong

Coordinates: 22°20′34″N 113°56′50″E

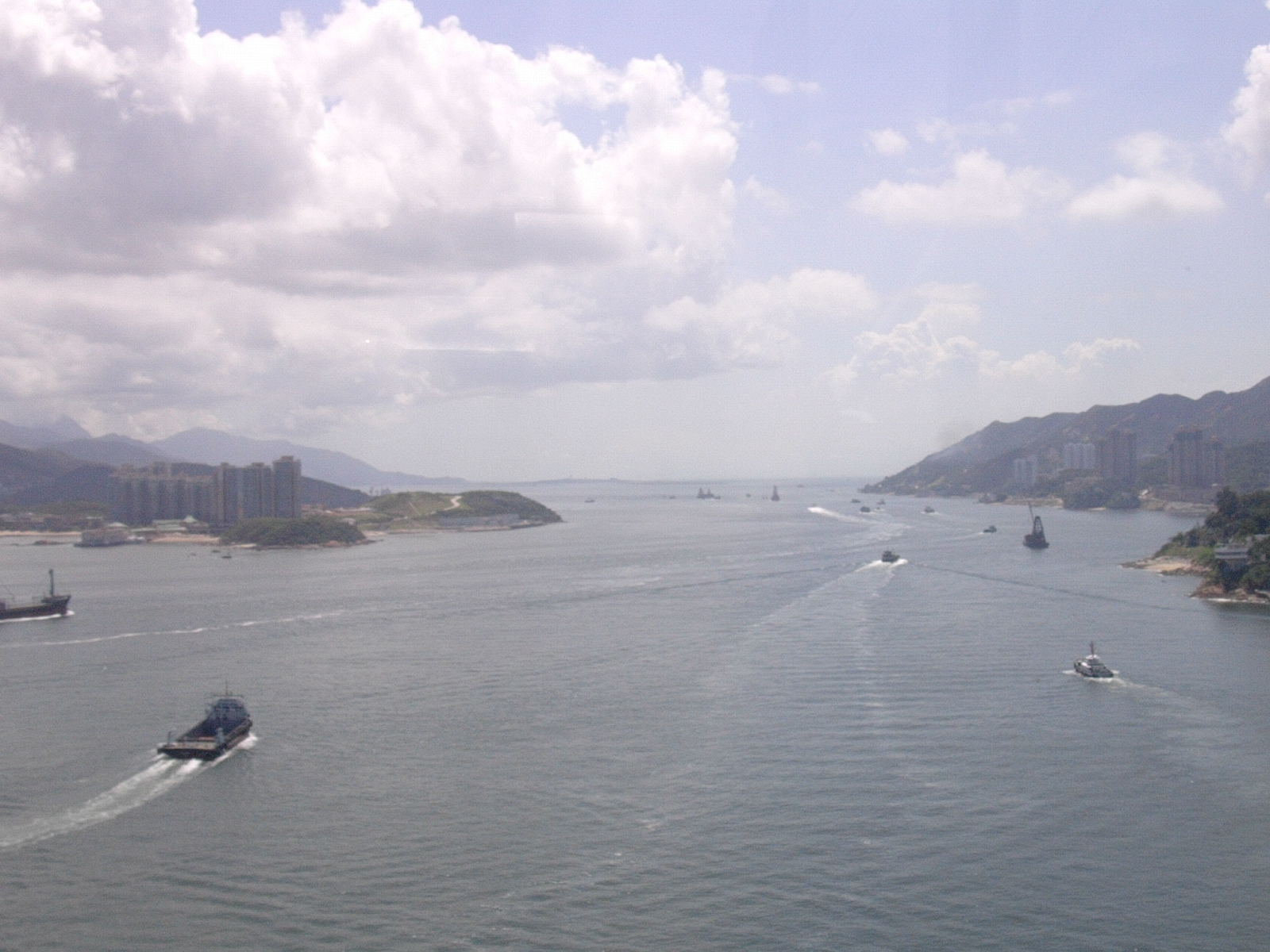
View of Urmston Road from Ting Kau Bridge

Urmston Road (Chinese: 龍鼓水道, literally 'Dragon Drum Channel', also named as 暗士頓水道) is a broad body of water between Lantau Island and Tuen Mun in Hong Kong. It forms an inshore passage between the northwest end of Victoria Harbour and the mouth of the Pearl River. At its eastern end it connects to the Western Working Anchorage through the Ma Wan Channel and the narrower Kap Shui Mun channel to the west of Ma Wan.

== History ==
Urmston Road is named after Sir James Brabazon Urmston, who was the British East India Company's China chief from 1819 to 1826. The passage received its English name in 1823; prior to that it was referred to as Toon-Koo Bay.

== Geography ==
Urmston Road contains a number of small islands and rocks, which confine the main shipping fairway to a relatively narrow course along the north side. It is occasionally used as an alternative route for the ferry service between Hong Kong and Macau in times of heavy weather from the south. There are several piers, shipping terminals and anchorages around Urmston Road, including the Tuen Mun River Trade Terminal. First Ferry operates a passenger ferry service across Urmston Road from Tuen Mun to Tung Chung.

A significant development in the area was the building in the 1990s of the new Hong Kong International Airport, almost entirely on reclaimed land around a rocky islet called Chek Lap Kok to the north of Lantau. This was followed by a tunnel crossing under Urmston Road connecting Chek Lap Kok to Tuen Mun that was complete in 2022.

== See also ==
- List of channels in Hong Kong
- Sha Chau
- Lung Kwu Chau
- The Brothers (islands), Hong Kong
- Tuen Mun–Chek Lap Kok Link
