= Park Island Ferry Pier =

Ferry terminal in Hong Kong

Coordinates: 22.3529°N 114.0644°E

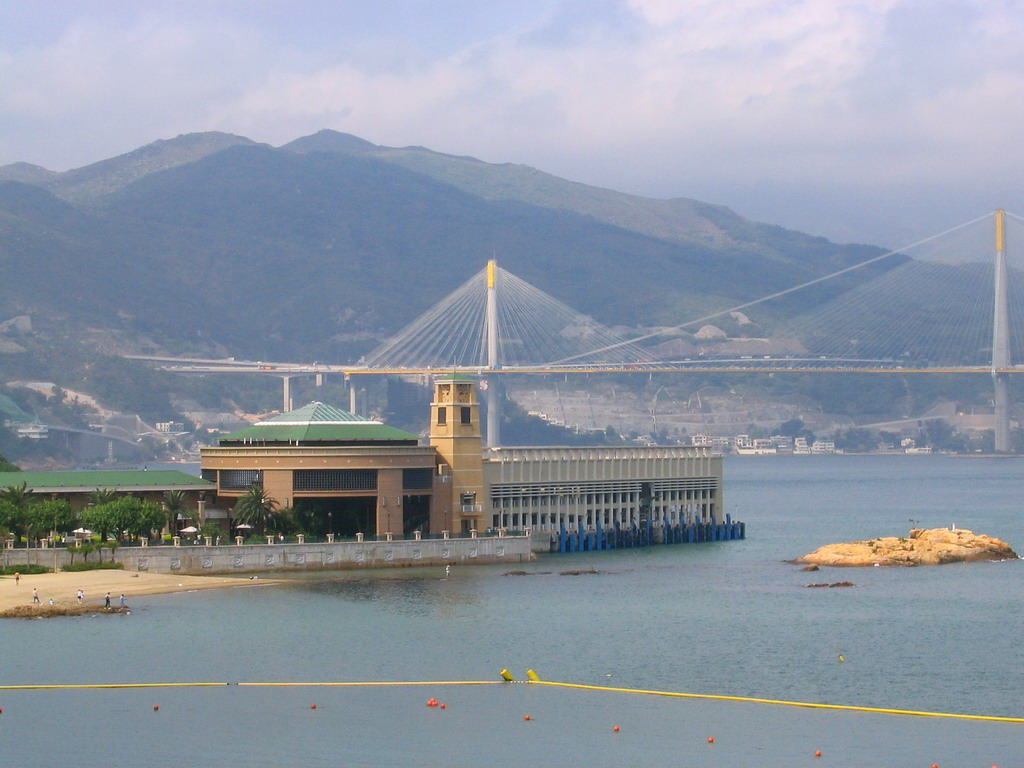
Park Island Ferry Pier on Ma Wan in April 2006. Ting Kau Bridge and the mainland Tsuen Wan District are visible in the background.

Park Island Ferry Pier (Chinese: 珀麗灣碼頭) is a ferry pier in Park Island, Ma Wan, Tsuen Wan, New Territories, Hong Kong. It is one of the main transport interchange of Park Island, a private housing estate in Ma Wan. It has one ferry route to Central, which is operated by Park Island Transport Company Limited.

Another route to Tsuen Wan Pier (near West Rail Tsuen Wan West station) was discontinued on 13 December 2012 after 10 years of operation. However, this route was later reinstated, due to Park Island residents' pressure, but with a much reduced service.
