= Noah's Ark (Hong Kong) =

Tourist attraction in Hong Kong

Coordinates: 22°20′53.5″N 114°03′41.6″E

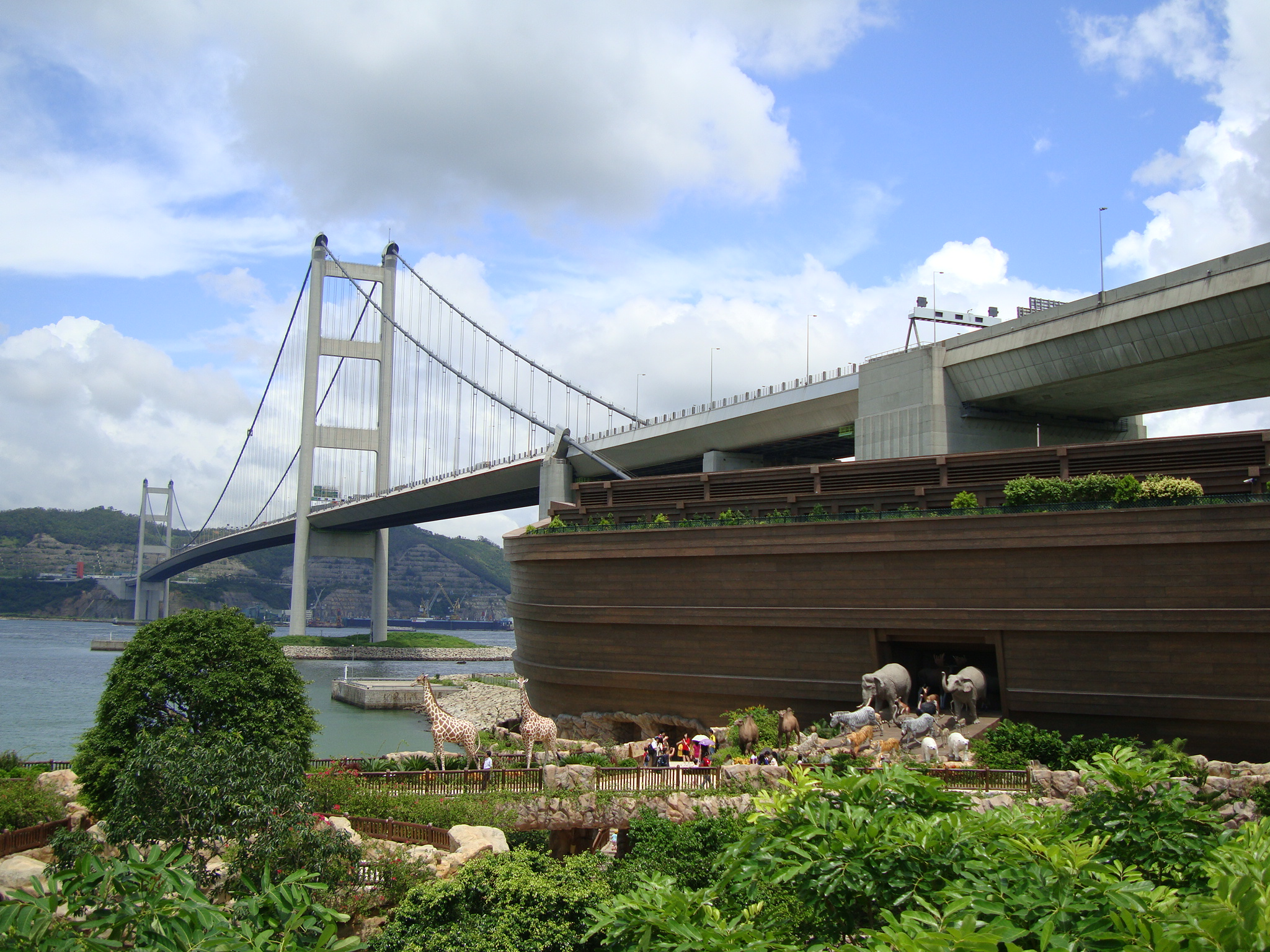
Noah's Ark beachfront of Tsing Ma Bridge

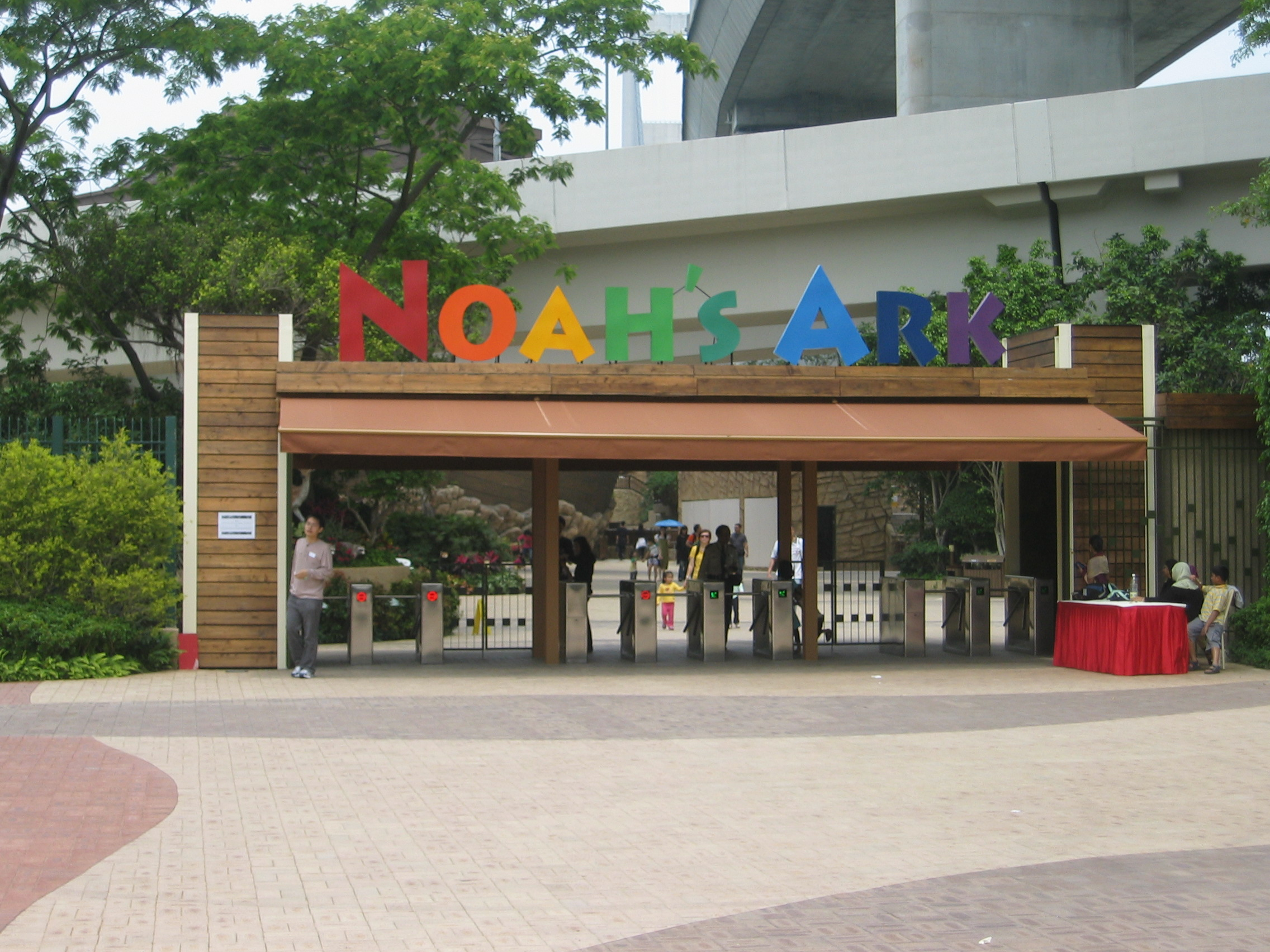
Main entrance of Noah's Ark, Hong Kong

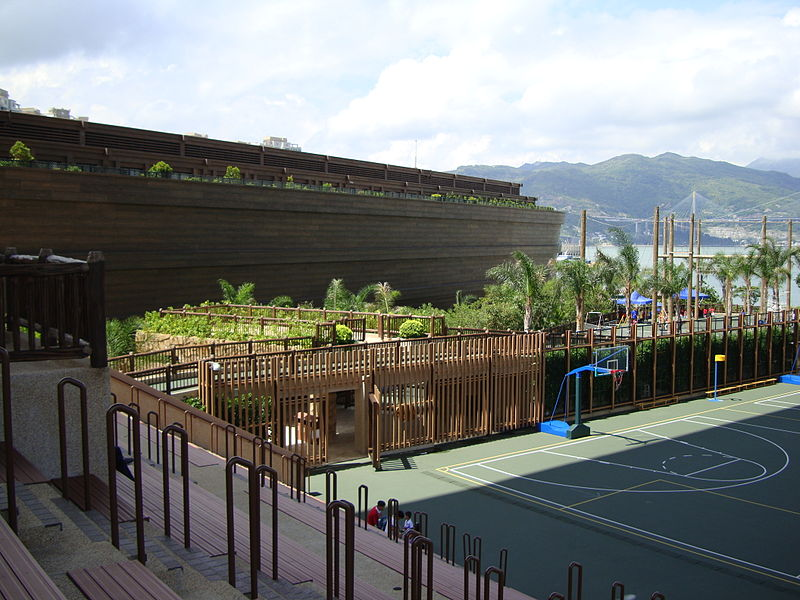
A side view of Noah's Ark

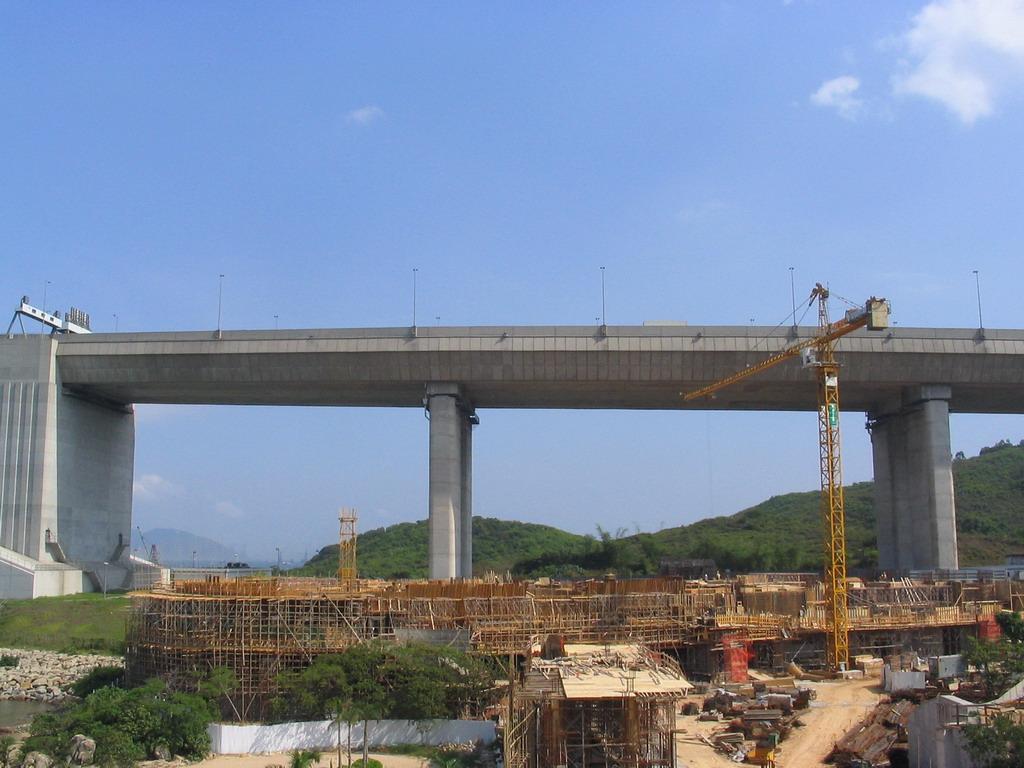
Noah's Ark under construction.

Noah's Ark is a tourist attraction located on Ma Wan Island in Hong Kong. It is an evangelical Christian theme park centred, according to its own materials, on the themes of nature, art, education and love. The overarching theme of the park is a creationist narrative. It was built by Thomas and Raymond Kwok, Hong Kong real estate developers who own the real estate company Sun Hung Kai.

== History ==
Part of Ma Wan Park, planning of Ma Wan Park began in 1997, after the Government agreed to subsidise the construction by 800 million HKD. The park was part of SHK's plan for developing the Ma Wan area generally, including the nearby Rosedale residential development. Construction began in 2005, with targets for phased openings in 2006 being missed.

The first phase of the park, originally scheduled for opening in 2006, opened in 2007, not including Noah's Ark. This phase included a nature park, which is free to visit. The rest of the park was completed in December 2008, with a limited opening in March 2009 and a full opening in May of that year.

=== Controversy ===
In 2012, the two Kwok brothers were charged with bribing Rafael Hui, the former Chief Secretary for Administration of Hong Kong from 2005 to 2007 who was in charge of the Ma Wan Park project (which included Noah's Ark) at the time of its construction, to be their "eyes and ears in government" in a case said to highlight "the cozy relationship between the city's powerful developers and government." Revealed in the court case was a memo by Thomas Kwok in which he wrote "We all know this park is only an excuse for village relocation, and our main target is only on the residential development plus the village relocation." The bribes from Thomas Kwok to Rafael Hui amounted to a total of HKD$8.5 million. The two brothers were arrested by the Independent Commission Against Corruption In December 2014, Thomas Kwok was convicted by the Court of Final Appeal of "conspiracy to commit misconduct in public office," while his brother Raymond Kwok was cleared of all charges. Thomas Kwok was sentenced to five years in prison and a fine of $500,000. Rafael Hui, Sun Hung Kai executive Thomas Chan and businessman Francis Kwan were also jailed.

== Attractions ==
The park's centrepiece is a multi-story building with a facade built to resemble Noah's Ark, where visitors may book a stay in either a hotel or a youth hostel located on the top floor.

Alighting from the ark are sculptures of 67 life-size pairs of exotic animals, birds and creatures.

Within the park is a nature garden alongside the existing natural landscape, where native trees have been preserved along the terraced paths. The park features amusements designed for young children together with a menagerie of small animals (mostly reptiles) in small display cages. There is also an obstacle course, climbing, and Outward Bound type courses.

=== Evangelism ===
Inside Noah's Ark the main attraction is a multimedia experience, including a 180-degree wide-screen theatre. The multimedia experience begins with an introduction to Judeo-Christian teaching from the time of Moses and features an imagined 'reconstruction' of the Holy of Holies complete with the Ark of the Covenant. There are guides who lead the audience through a series of theatres and galleries designed to convey messages about the challenges that the Earth and humanity are facing today.

The suggested solution to said problems is an acceptance of the Christian God and Biblical teaching. The multimedia experience concludes with a history of the Bible with emphasis on the dissemination of the Bible in China. Elsewhere within the park visitors are likely to come across staff playing the role of the Holy Family being pursued by others dressed as Roman legionaries.

== See also ==
- Flood myth and List of flood myths
- Noah's Ark replicas and derivatives
