= Ma Wan Channel =

Coordinates: 22°20′54″N 114°4′25″E

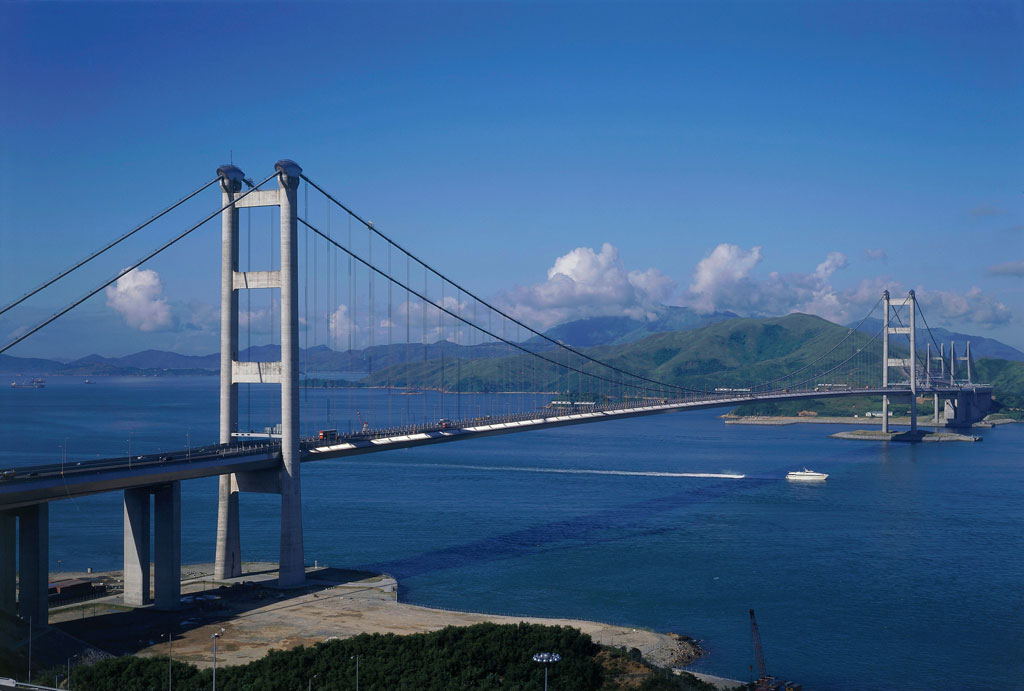
The Tsing Ma Bridge crossing the Ma Wan Channel, seen from Tsing Yi in June 2007

Ma Wan Channel (Chinese: 馬灣海峽) is a channel between Ma Wan and Tsing Yi islands in Hong Kong. The north end of the channel is Ting Kau where it joins the Rambler Channel. To the west it joins with the Kap Shui Mun channel running to the south of Ma Wan, leading into Urmston Road. To the east, it divides into the Tsing Yi Channel and the Rambler Channel, leading to Tsuen Wan and Kwai Chung. To the south is the Western Working Anchorage of Victoria Harbour.

A long suspension bridge, the Tsing Ma Bridge, connects Ma Wan and Tsing Yi, bridging across the Ma Wan channel. One of the bridge towers stands on an artificial island near the Ma Wan side of the channel.

Historically, it is also known as Kai Tap Mun (雞踏門) or Kai Tsap Mun (雞閘門).
