= Ma Wan Park =

Park in Hong Kong

Coordinates: 22°20′56″N 114°03′34″E

- Traditional Chinese: 馬灣公園
Transcriptions
Yue: Cantonese
- Yale Romanization: Máh wāan gūng yùhn
- Jyutping: Maa5 waan1 gung1 jyun4

Ma Wan Park logo

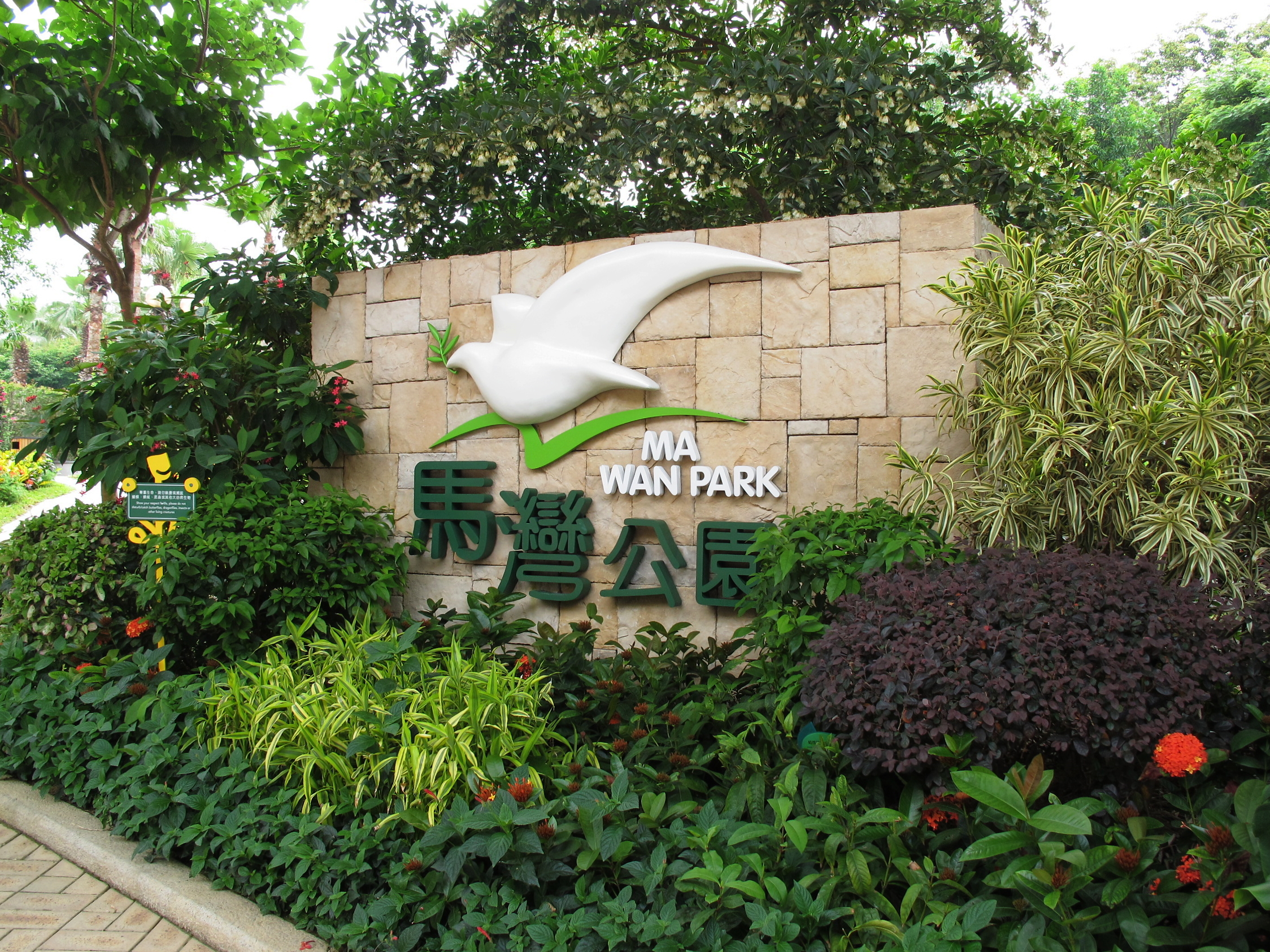
Ma Wan Park logo at the park.

Ma Wan Park is a park on Ma Wan island, New Territories, Hong Kong opened on 1 July 2007. It is operated by Sun Hung Kai Properties with investment from the Hong Kong Government. Ma Wan Island is connected to Tsing Yi Island by the Tsing Ma Bridge.

The park is billed as a tourist attraction and education centre that combines nature, learning, arts and love, with an emphasis on outdoor interactive instruction. It adjoins the Park Island apartment complex, mainly developed by Sun Hung Kai Properties as part of the Ma Wan Development joint venture project.

Admission to the Nature Garden is restricted for some schedule, else the entrance is free. Bookings are required for group visits. Exploration activities are available from 9:00 am to 1:00 pm on Mondays, Fridays and Saturdays. Registration is required and there is an admission fee.

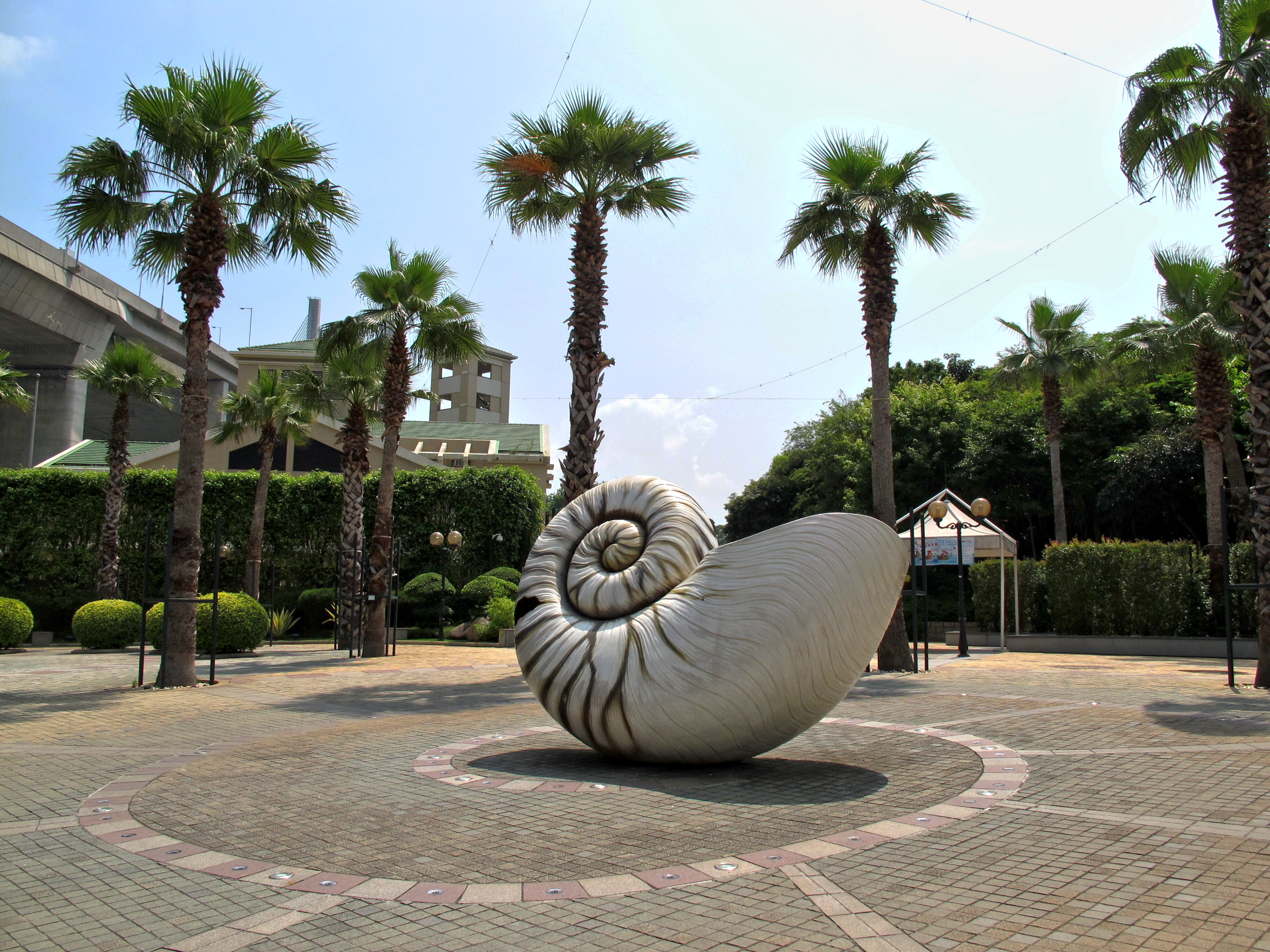
Gold Mean Plaza

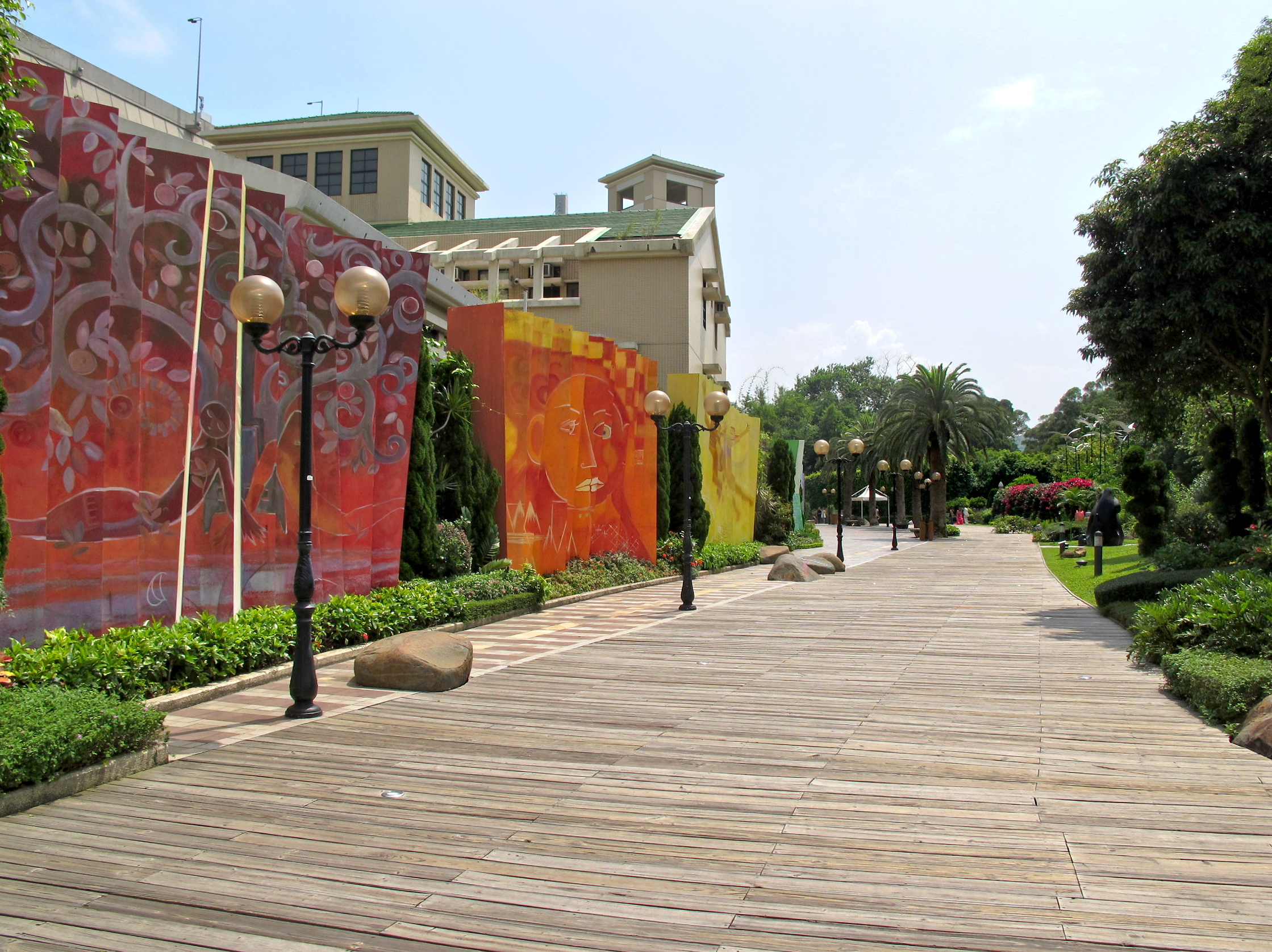
Rainbow Wall in Ma Wan Park

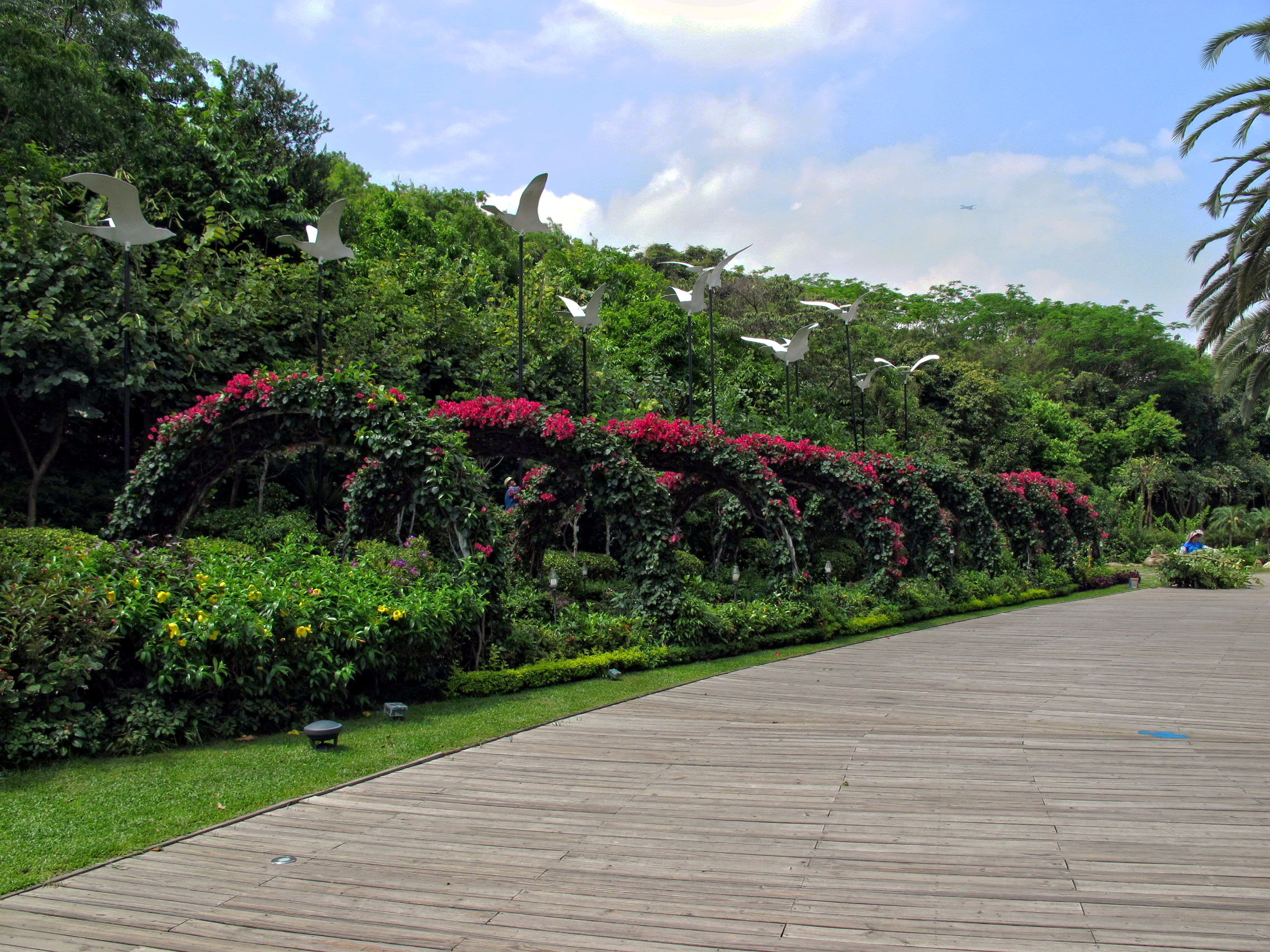
Sweet Garden

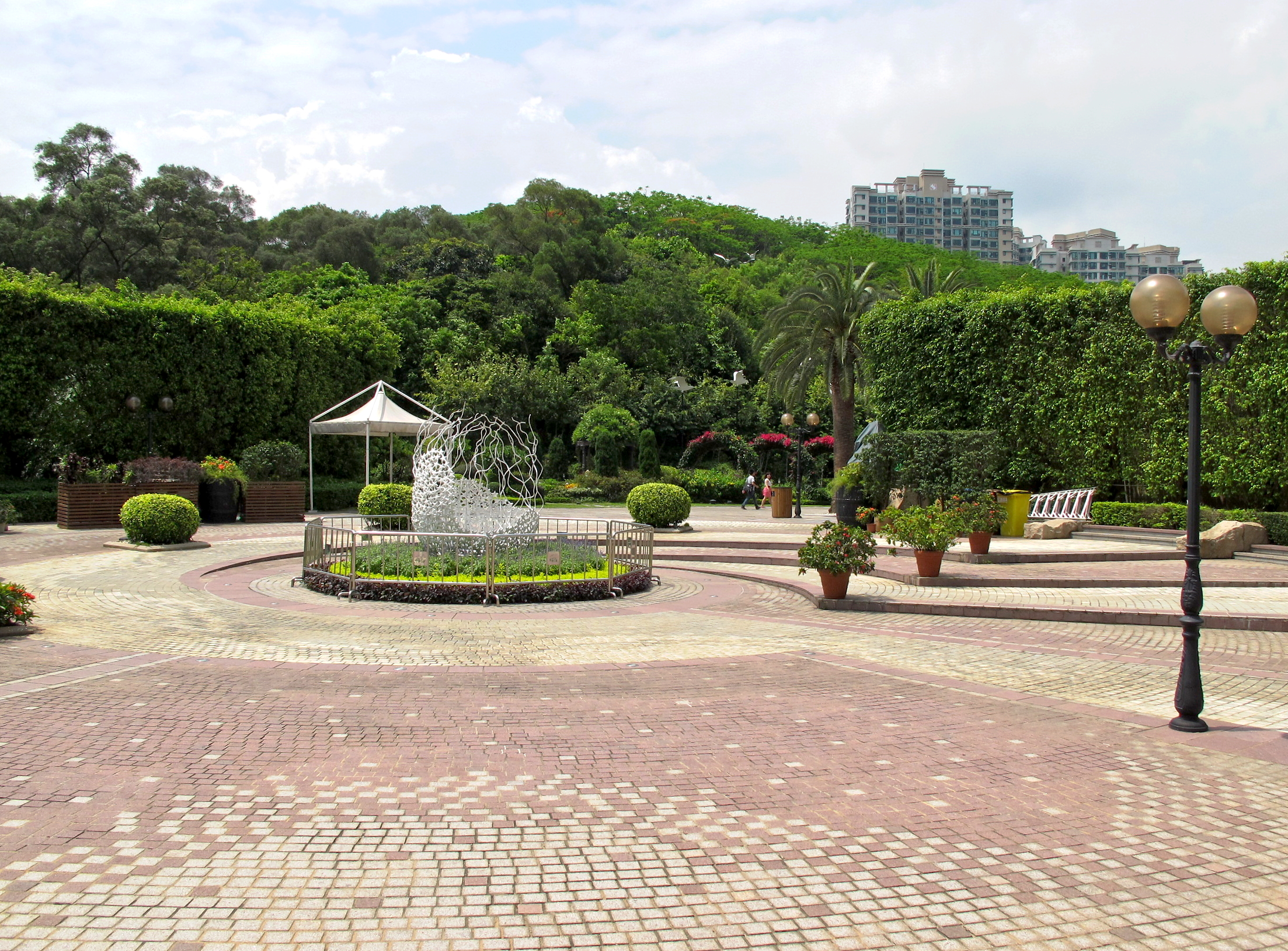
Gathering Plaza

== Noah's Ark ==
The park also features Noah's Ark, a real size replica of the biblical Noah's Ark. Inside the ark are exhibitions, restaurants and a hotel.
