= Kowloon station =

Kowloon station may refer to:

- Kowloon Station (constituency), a constituency in Yau Tsim Mong District
- Kowloon station (MTR), a station of the MTR rapid transit system in Hong Kong
- Kowloon railway station (KCR), the former southern terminus of the Kowloon–Canton Railway, demolished in 1978
- Hung Hom station, also named KCR Kowloon Terminus, an MTR station with intercity and rapid transit services which replaced the KCR station in 1975

== See also ==
- Hong Kong West Kowloon railway station, a high-speed rail station in Hong Kong
- Guryong station, a station in Seoul with the same Chinese characters
