= Ma Wan =

Island in Hong Kong

馬灣
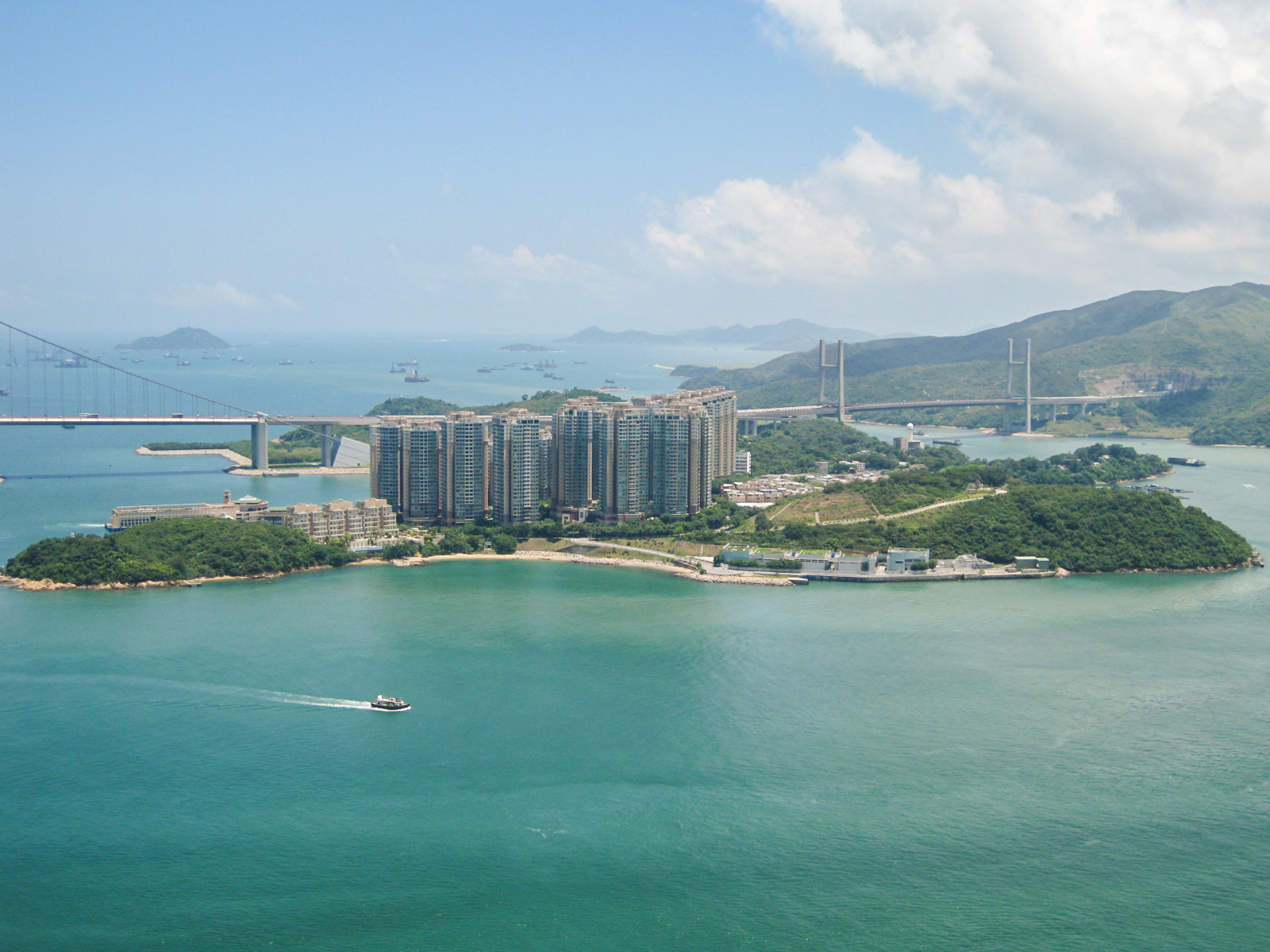
- General view of Ma Wan from the north

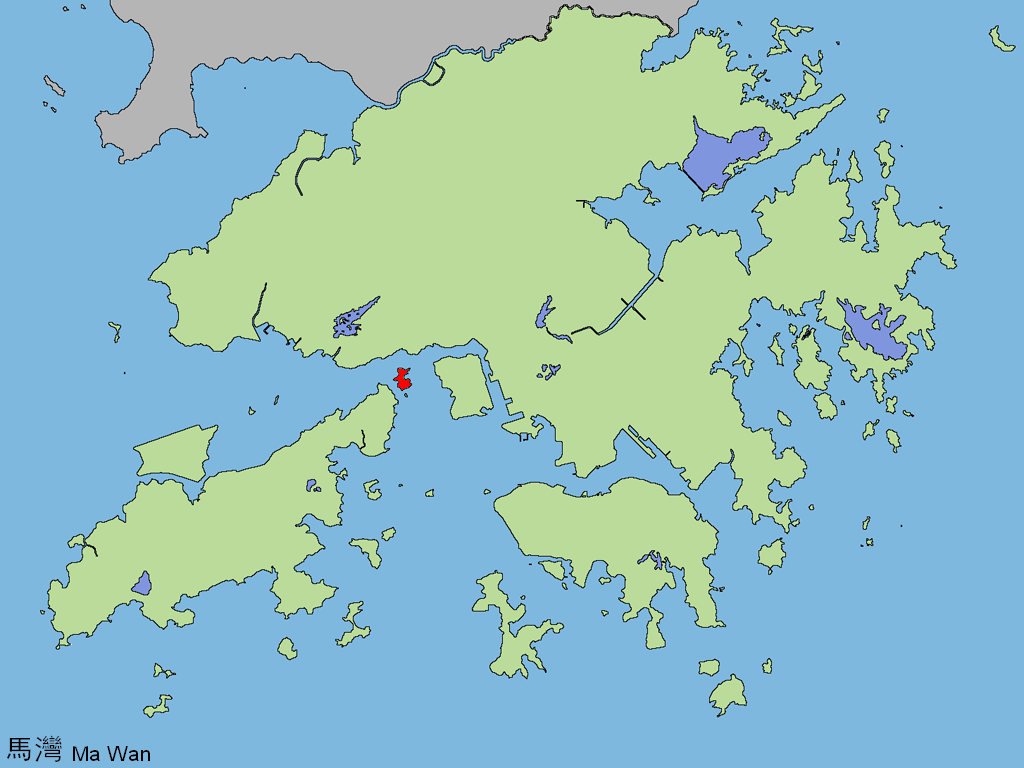
- Location of Ma Wan within Hong Kong

Geography
- Location: Between Lantau Island and Tsing Yi Island
- Coordinates: 22°20′56″N 114°3′35″E
- Area: 0.97 km^{2} (0.37 sq mi)
- Highest elevation: 69 m (226 ft)
- Highest point: Tai Leng Tau

Ma Wan
- Traditional Chinese: 馬灣
- Simplified Chinese: 马湾
Transcriptions
Standard Mandarin
- Hanyu Pinyin: Mǎwān
Hakka
- Romanization: Ma^{1} Van^{1}
Yue: Cantonese
- Yale Romanization: Máh wàahn
- Jyutping: Maa^{5} Waan^{4}

Ma Wan is an island in Hong Kong, located between Lantau Island and Tsing Yi Island. Administratively, it is part of the Tsuen Wan District and has an area of 0.97 square kilometres (240 acres).

The Lantau Link that passes through Ma Wan was constructed in the mid-1990s as part of the Hong Kong Government's Rose Garden plan to connect the newly built Hong Kong International Airport to the city centre. Its development fostered plans to develop the island. Today, a large part of Ma Wan is occupied by the Park Island apartment complex. A theme park, named Ma Wan Park, was built to accompany the housing project, with its first phase opened on 1 July 2007.

== Geography ==
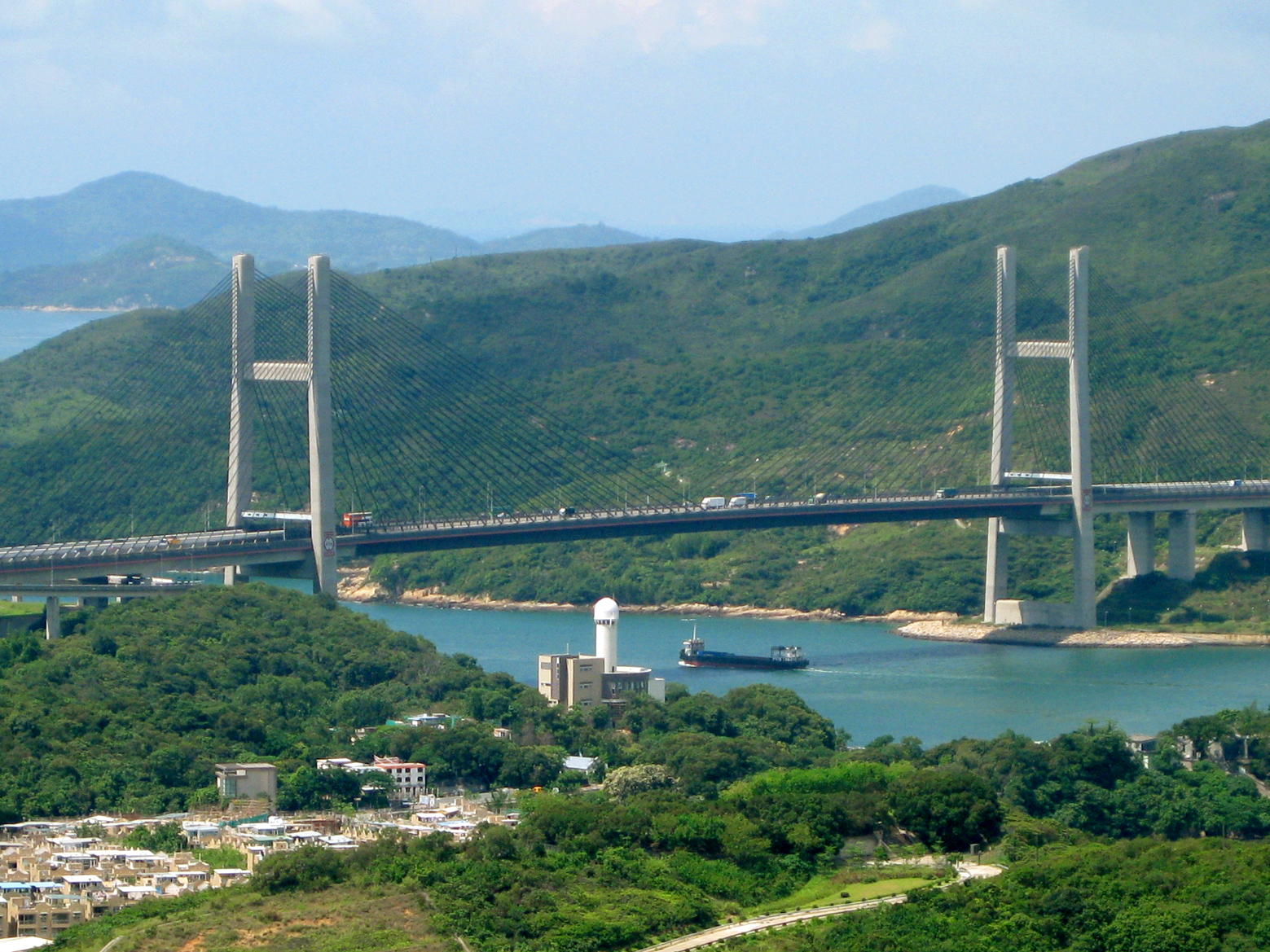
Kap Shui Mun Bridge crossing the Kap Shui Mun channel, with Tin Liu Village of Ma Wan in the foreground.

Ma Wan has an area of 0.97 square kilometres (0.37 mi^{2}). Its highest point is Tai Leng Tau (69 metres (226 ft)) in the southeast. Two channels, the Ma Wan Channel and the Rambler Channel, separate Ma Wan with the other major islands.

- to the east is the Ma Wan Channel, separating it from Tsing Yi Island. The channel is crossed by the Tsing Ma Bridge.
- to the southwest is Kap Shui Mun, separating it from the Tsing Chau Tsai Peninsula of Lantau Island. The channel is crossed by the Kap Shui Mun Bridge.
- the north seafront is opposite Tsing Lung Tau and Sham Tseng on the mainland Tsuen Wan District, part of the New Territories.
- The south faces the small Tang Lung Chau islet.

== Geology ==
The surface rocks in Ma Wan are mostly volcanic rocks called the Yim Tin Tsai Formation. This is a coarse ash crystal tuff containing lapilli. Some layers of fine volcanic ash are found in the far north of the island. The contained mafic minerals are biotite and amphibole. The tuff contains mostly quartz and alkali and plagioclase feldspar. Other minerals include apatite, magnetite, monazite and zircon.

The Ma Wan granite is fine grained. It contains microcline, and few feldspar phenocrysts. The main minerals are quartz, perthitic orthoclase, and plagioclase. The dark mineral is mostly biotite. Also contained is zircon, fluorite, and allanite. It is found on the south of the east coast.

Dykes formed later with a mafic dyke injected first followed by a felsic material. A feldsparphyric dyke crosses the island east–west near the ferry pier.

Several Cenozoic age quartzphyric rhyolite dykes cross the island. These are also injected with narrow dacitic dykes, and last of all very fine grained mafic basaltic dykes.

A north east trending fault crosses Ma Wan from the typhoon shelter on the west side to the Tun Wan. The island is separated from Lantau Island by a fault under the channel called the Kap Shui Mun Fault. This is angled to the North West, and has its direction controlled by the major tectonic zone it is in called the Linhua Shan Fault System that extends from the coast of Guangdong to Fujian.

Prominent joints are at 85° parallel to the dykes. Other joints are close to horizontal, which can cause rocks to form sheets.

== History ==
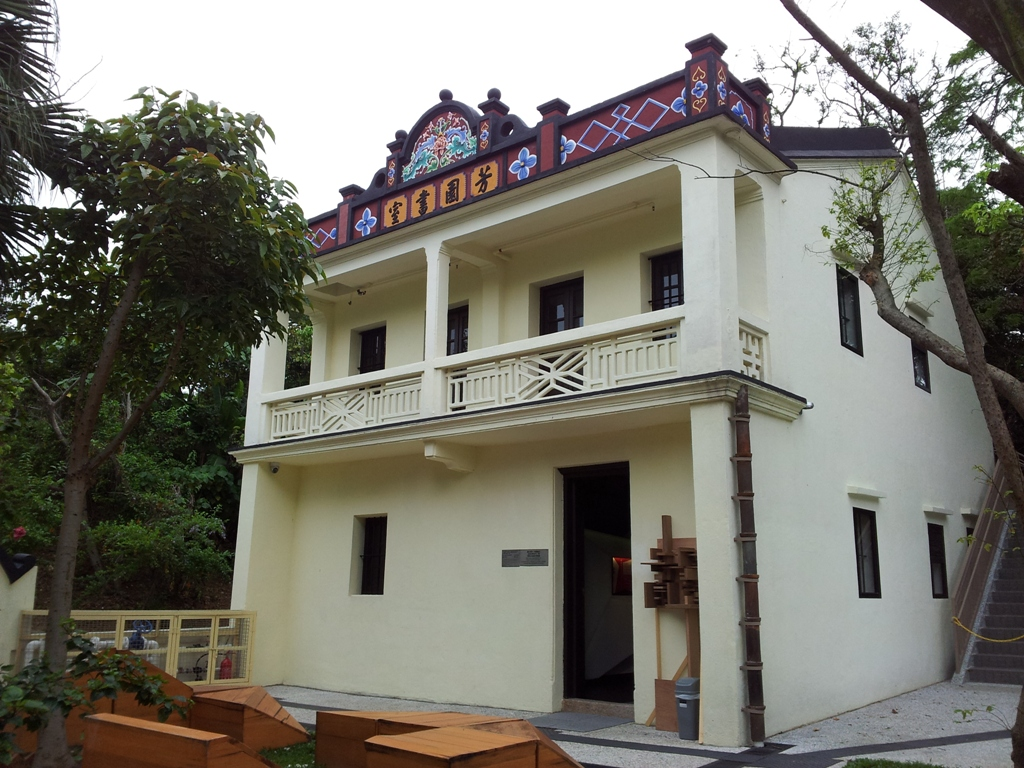
Fong Yuen Study Hall.

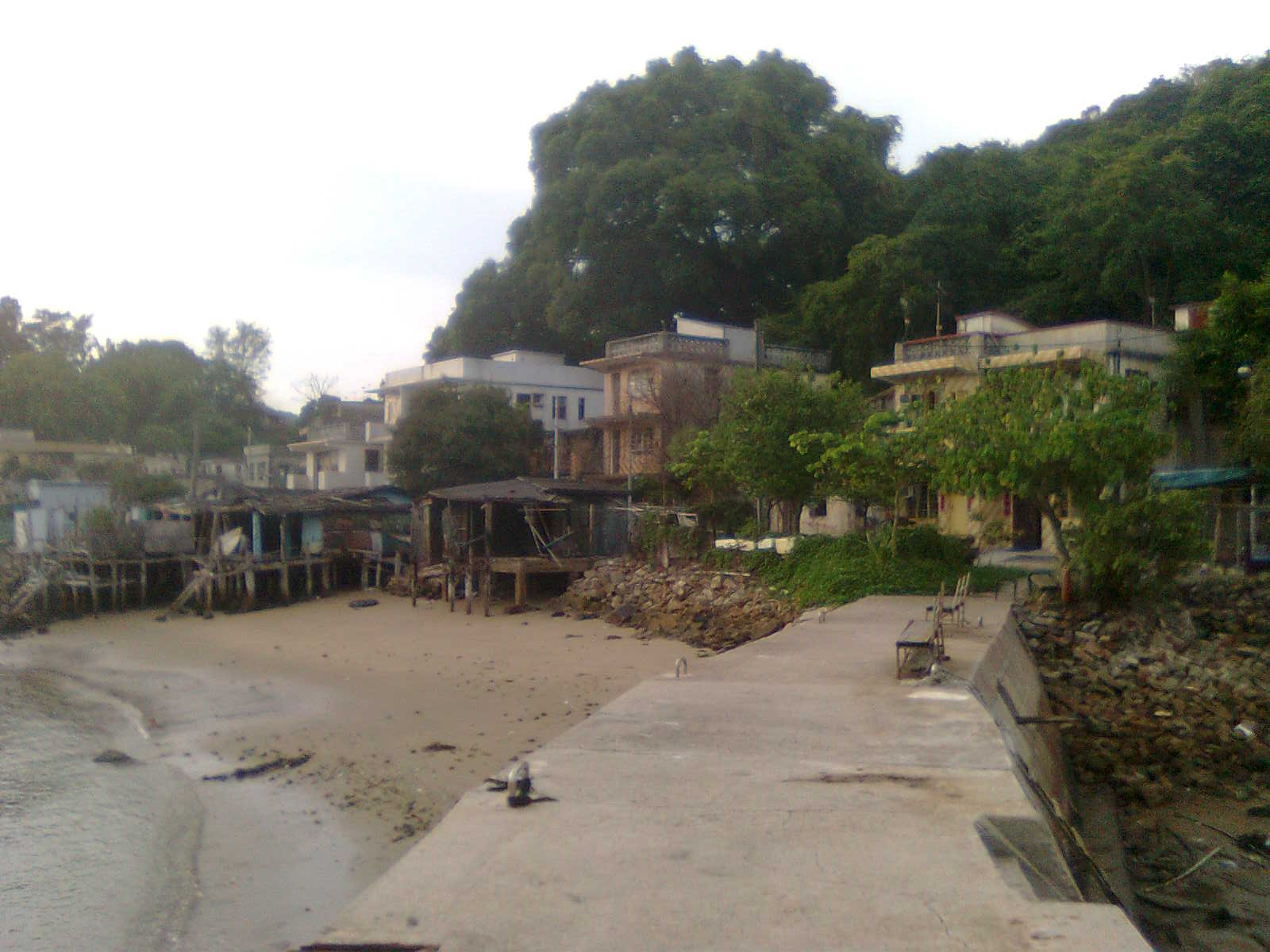
The vacated Ma Wan Main Street Village aka. Ma Wan Town in 2011, viewed from the breakwater of the typhoon shelter.

Remains have been found from the Mid-Neolithic Age (about 3000 BC), the late Neolithic Age (about 2000 BC), the early to late Bronze Age of coastal South China (1500–500 BC), the period of the Warring States to the Han dynasty (206 BC −220 AD), the Tang dynasty (618–917 AD) and the Qing dynasty (1644–1911 AD).

In 1997, a joint excavation by the Antiquities and Monuments Office and the Institute of Archaeology of the Chinese Academy of Social Sciences found complete Neolithic human skeletal remains in tombs at the Tung Wan Tsai North site. 20 tombs were found spanning from the late Neolithic to the early Bronze Age.

The prehistoric island had late neolithic inhabitants as proved by recent excavations. There were also inhabitants here during the Han dynasty. Foreign visitors first arrived on the island in 1794.

Ma Wan once had a Customs house, still recorded by a stone monument named "Kowloon Gate" monument. (near the old Rural Committee building). It ceased activity on 4 October 1899. Similar customs stations had been established at Fat Tau Chau and Cheung Chau.

In 1965 as part of the United States CARE program, 12 two storey housing units, and one communal house were donated and built on a top of a hill near the Fishermen's Association. The new village costed around HK$ 200,000 to build, and could house 24 families. After naming it Ma Wan Fishermen's Village (馬灣漁民新村), it was officially opened on the 7th of December 1965 by Arthur Patrick Richardson (李作新), the Assistant Director of the Agriculture, Fisheries and Conservation Department.

In the early 1970s, the island across from Ma Wan was occupied by three families. Their family names were Woo, Pang, and Woo. The children of these families attended the kindergarten and Fong Yuen School in Ma Wan. Water transportation to Ma Wan was signalled by waving a flag at the pier.

As of 1995, fish farming was the predominant economic activity on Ma Wan.

Ma Wan had a population of 800 in 2000. With the development of the Park Island apartment complex, villagers were rehoused in the northern part of the island. As part of the compensation package, they could choose either a 3-storey traditional village house of 2,100 square feet (0.048 acres) or 3 separate units, each of 700 square feet (65 m^{2}) in one single block.

== Features ==
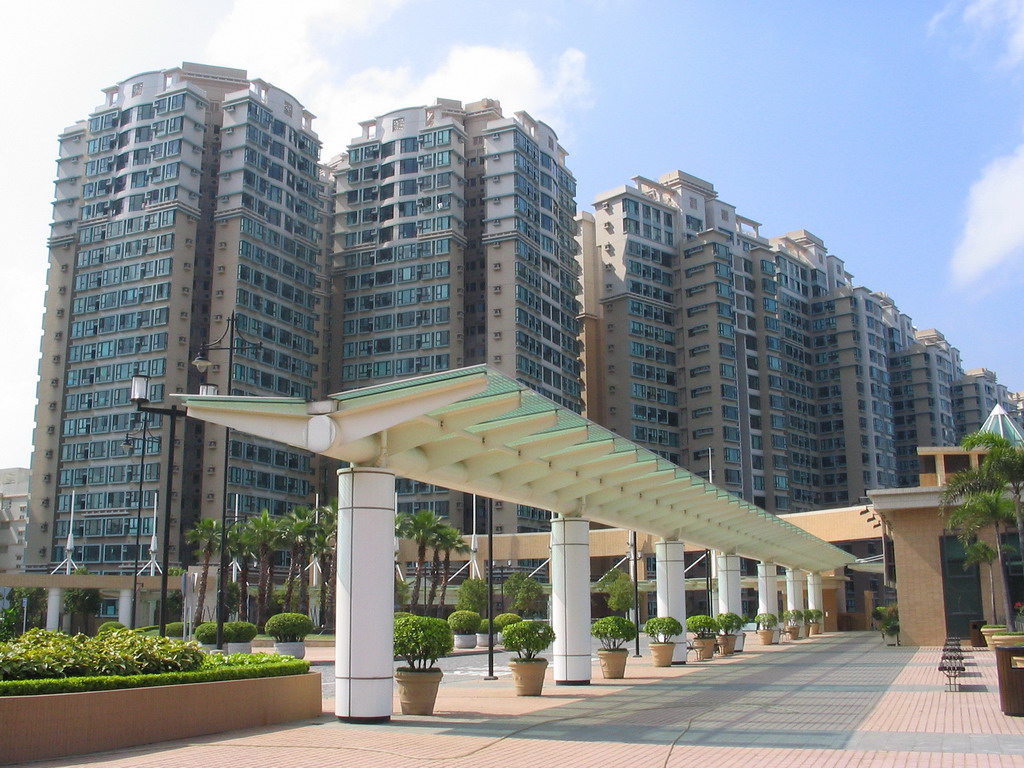
Blocks of the Park Island apartment complex.

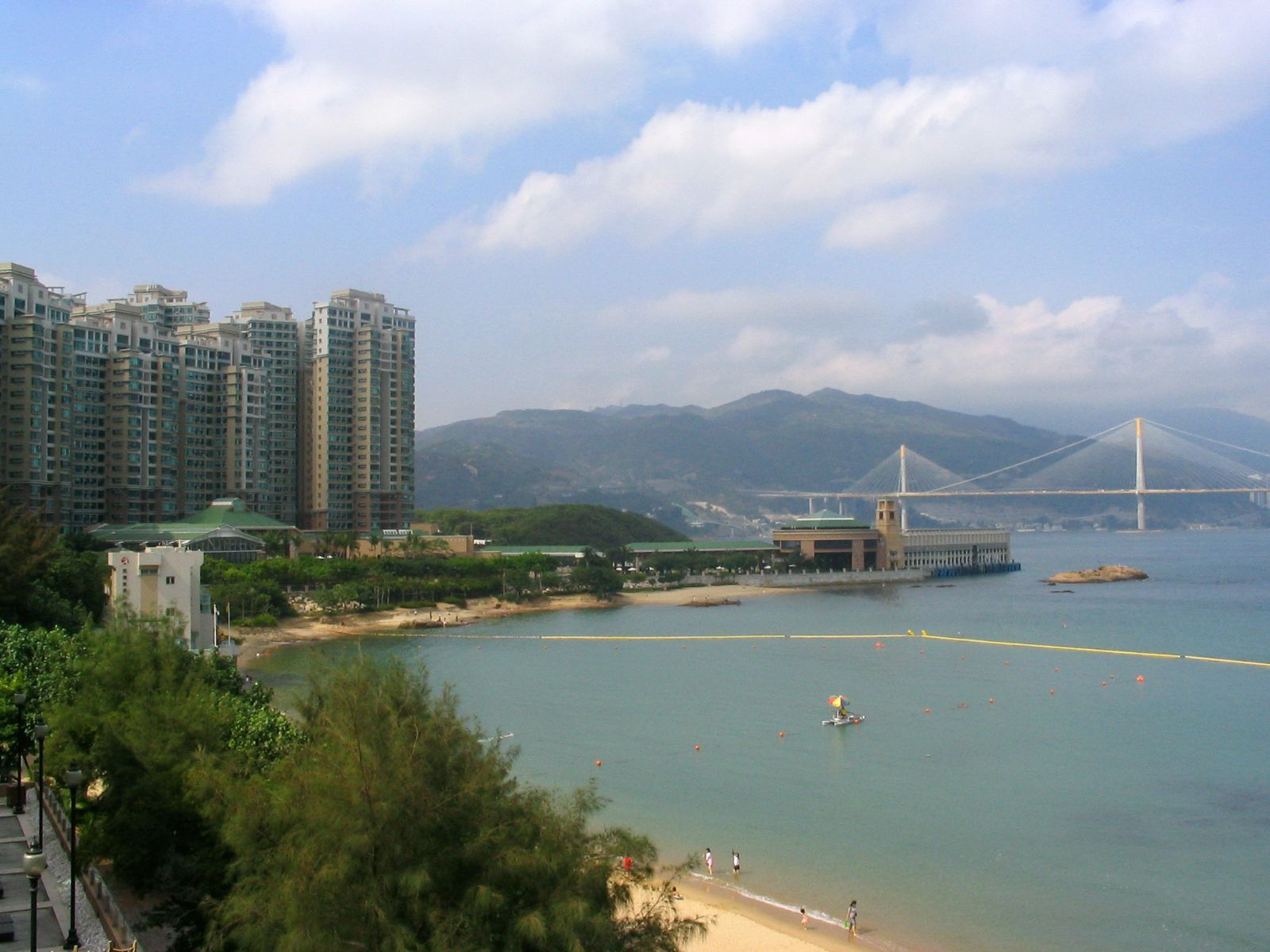
View of Ma Wan Tung Wan Beach with Park Island Ferry Pier in the middle right. The blocks on the left are part of the Park Island apartment complex. Ting Kau Bridge and the mainland Tsuen Wan District are visible in the background.

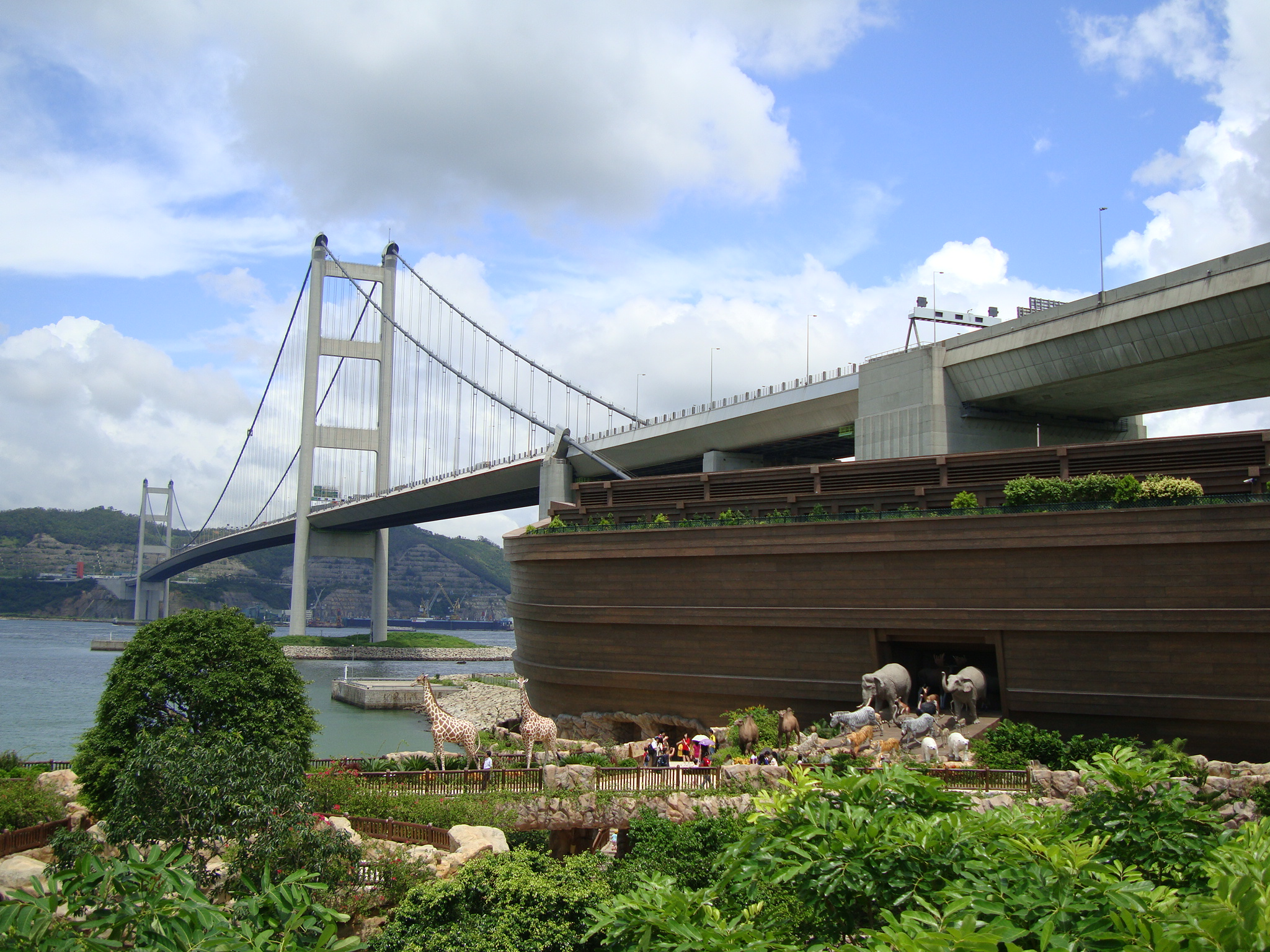
Noah's Ark attraction in Ma Wan Park, with the Tsing Ma Bridge in the background.

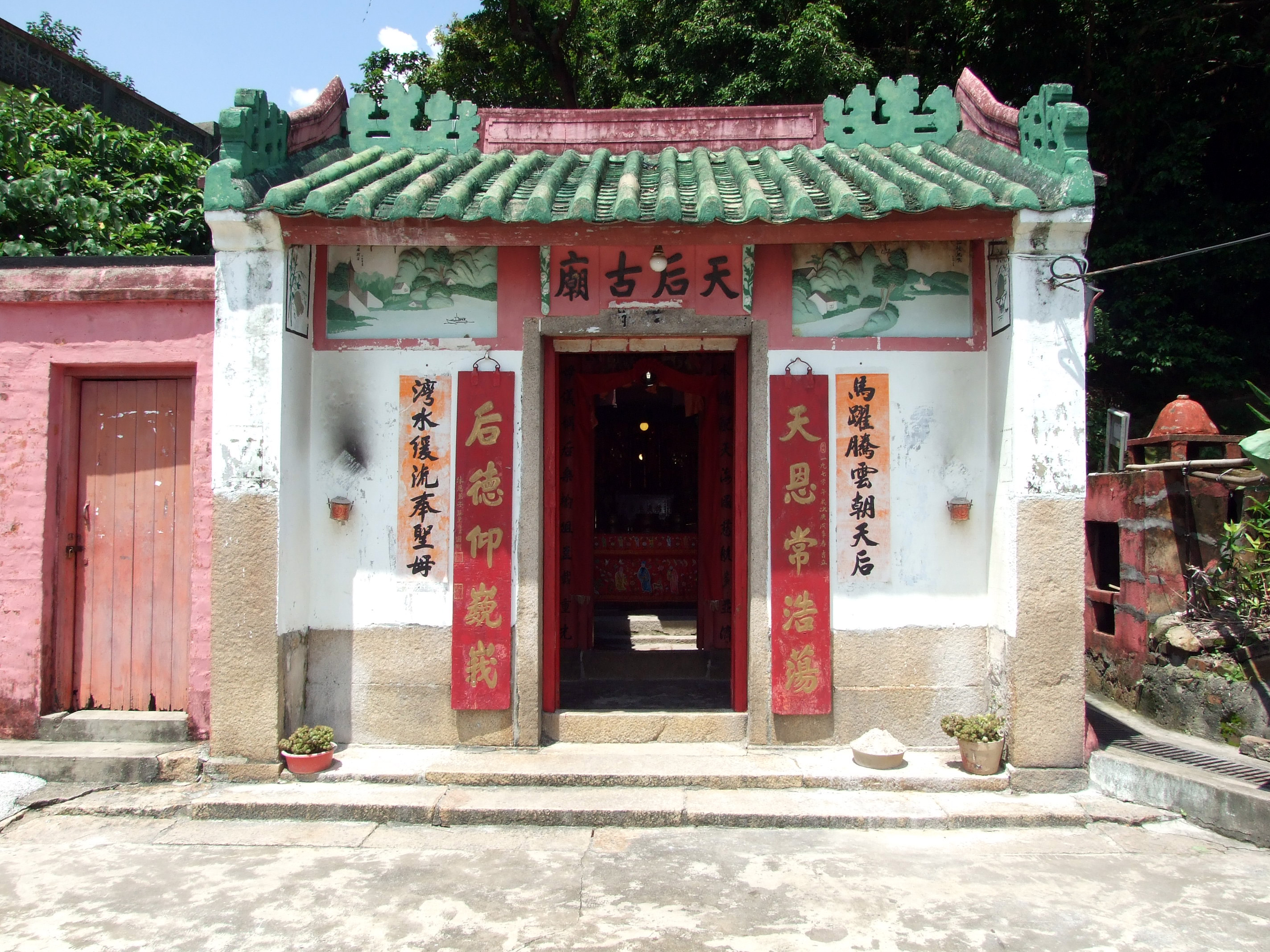
Tin Hau Temple in Ma Wan Main Street Village.

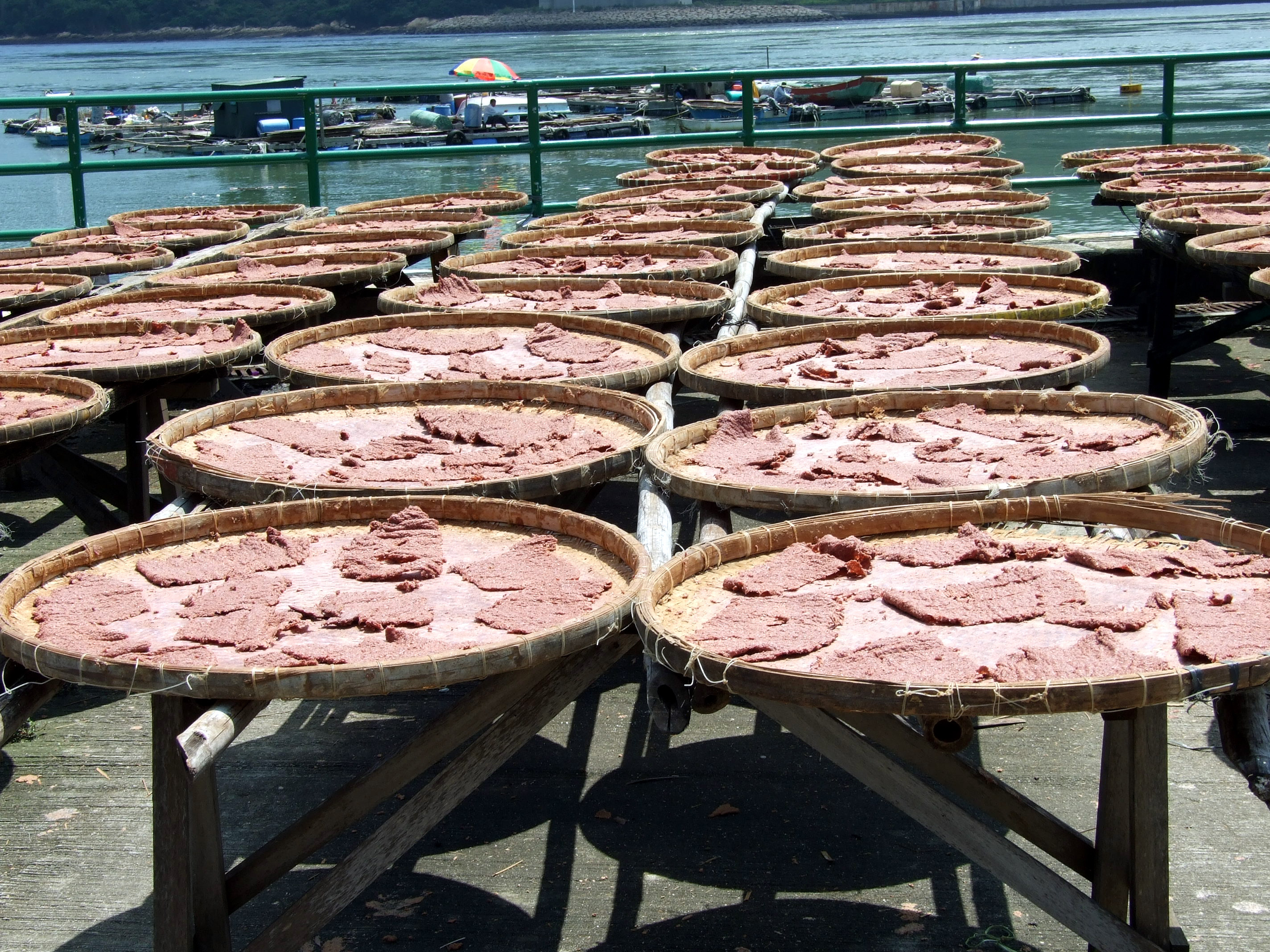
Shrimp paste being sundried in Ma Wan, next to Kap Shui Mun.

=== Park Island ===
Park Island is a private housing estate that was mainly developed by Sun Hung Kai Properties as part of the Ma Wan Development joint venture project and completed from 2002 to 2006 in six phases.

=== Villages ===
- Ma Wan Town, also known as Ma Wan Main Street Village, is a former fishing village with stilt houses (pang uk). It has been vacated.
- Ma Wan Fishermen's Village (馬灣漁民新村) aka. Ma Wan CARE Village. It has been vacated.
- 250-year-old village, quite empty as of 2007—The new Tin Liu Village has been built a bit on top of it.
- The new villages are:
  - Ma Wan Main Street Village Central (馬灣大街村中)
  - Ma Wan Main Street Village East (馬灣大街村東)
  - Ma Wan Main Street Village South (馬灣大街村南)
  - Ma Wan Main Street Village (馬灣大街村北)
  - Tin Liu New Village (田寮新村)

Ma Wan Main Street Village and Tin Liu are recognized villages under the New Territories Small House Policy.

=== Leisure ===
- Ma Wan Park
- The Heritage Centre in Ma Wan Park exhibits the evolution of the island since Neolithic to nowadays, includes a Tang dynasty mud kiln and a Qing dynasty brick kiln found on Ma Wan, and replicas of the late Neolithic skeletons.
- Noah's Ark Museum in Ma Wan Park
- Ma Wan Tung Wan Beach is managed by the Leisure and Cultural Services Department.

=== Religion ===
- Annual traditional festivals, such as Tin Hau.
- There are two Tin Hau Temples on Ma Wan. One has been rebuilt on the northern beach and is said to have been originally built by the local pirate Cheung Po Tsai, who often looked after the locals. Another one is located at the Ma Wan Main Street Village.
- Ma Wan Alliance Church

=== Education ===
- Kei Wai Primary School
- Creative Kindergarten

=== Culture ===
- Cantonese Opera productions.
- Local production of the shrimp paste "habe"
- Fong Yuen Study Hall, formerly the Chan Study Hall, was first built by the Chan clan of Tin Liu before the 1900s. The Chan Study Hall was rebuilt with Western influence and renamed as "Fong Yuen Study Hall", literally meaning a nice place for study, in the 1920s to 1930s. (See Revitalising Historic Buildings Through Partnership Scheme)

=== Others ===
- Clear water wells
- Deep waters (for Hong Kong) surrounding – 30 metres (98 ft)
- Popular photography site.
- Small red crabs.
- Cemetery on the south side.
- The Salvation Army Ma Wan Youth Camp

=== Infrastructure ===
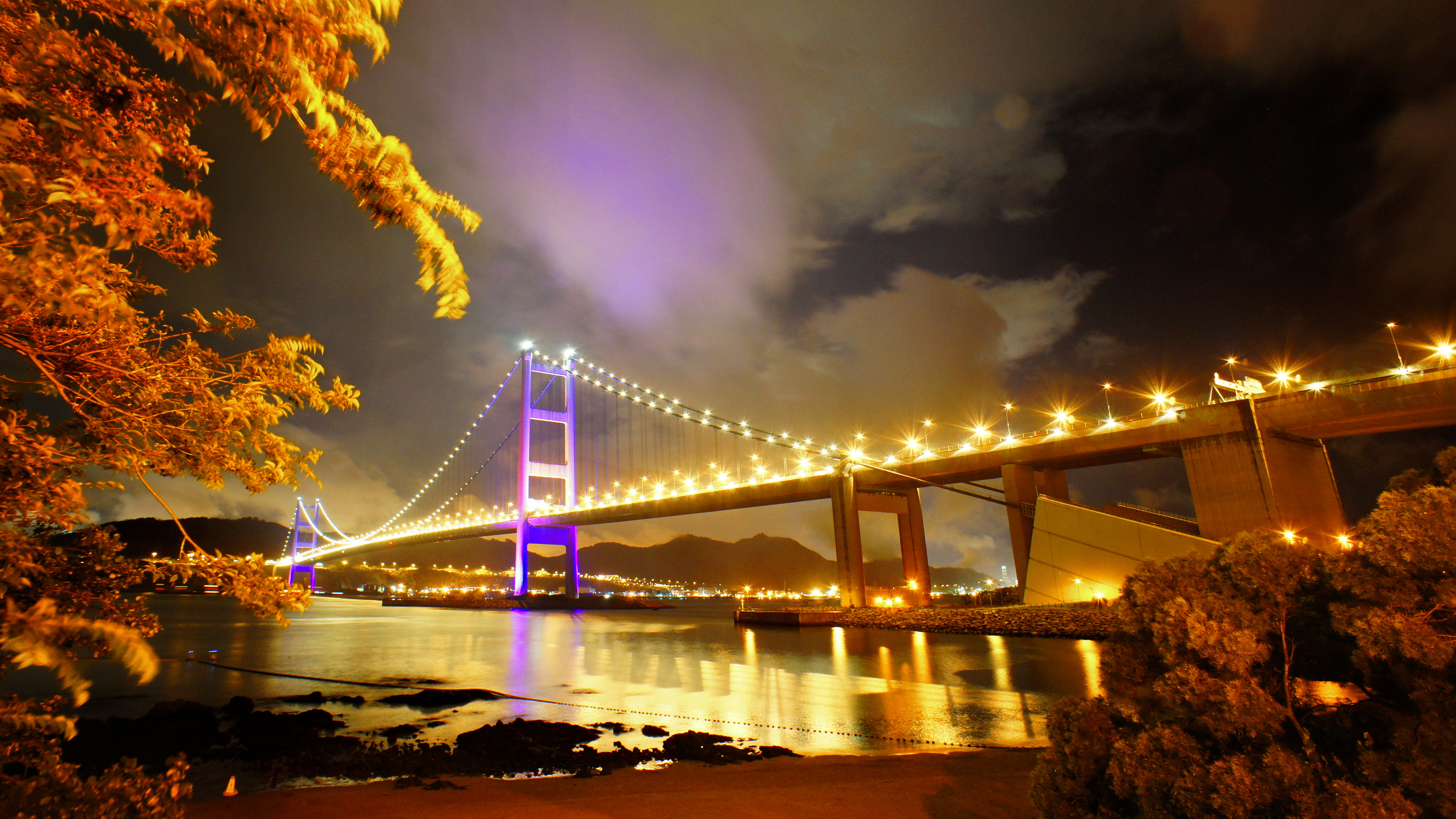
Ma Wan Tung Wan beach, with the Tsing Ma Bridge in the background.

- Tsing Ma Bridge, world's 16th longest span suspension bridge carrying both road and railway traffic. Tsing Ma Bridge, Ma Wan Viaduct, and Kap Shui Mun Bridge together link Tsing Yi island to Lantau Island and form the Lantau Link.
- Park Island Ferry Pier

== Transport ==
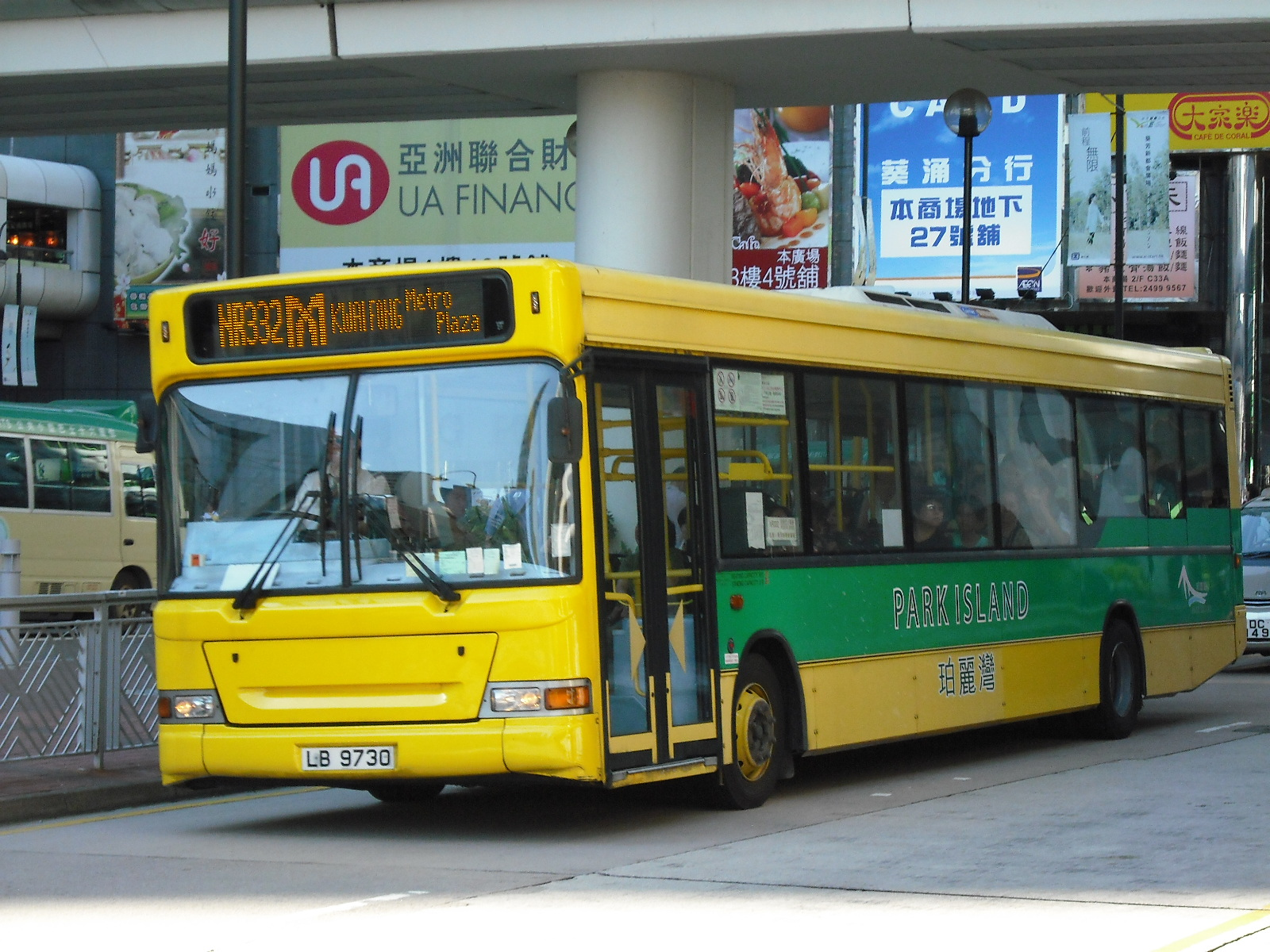
A Dennis Super Pointer Dart operated by Park Island Transport.

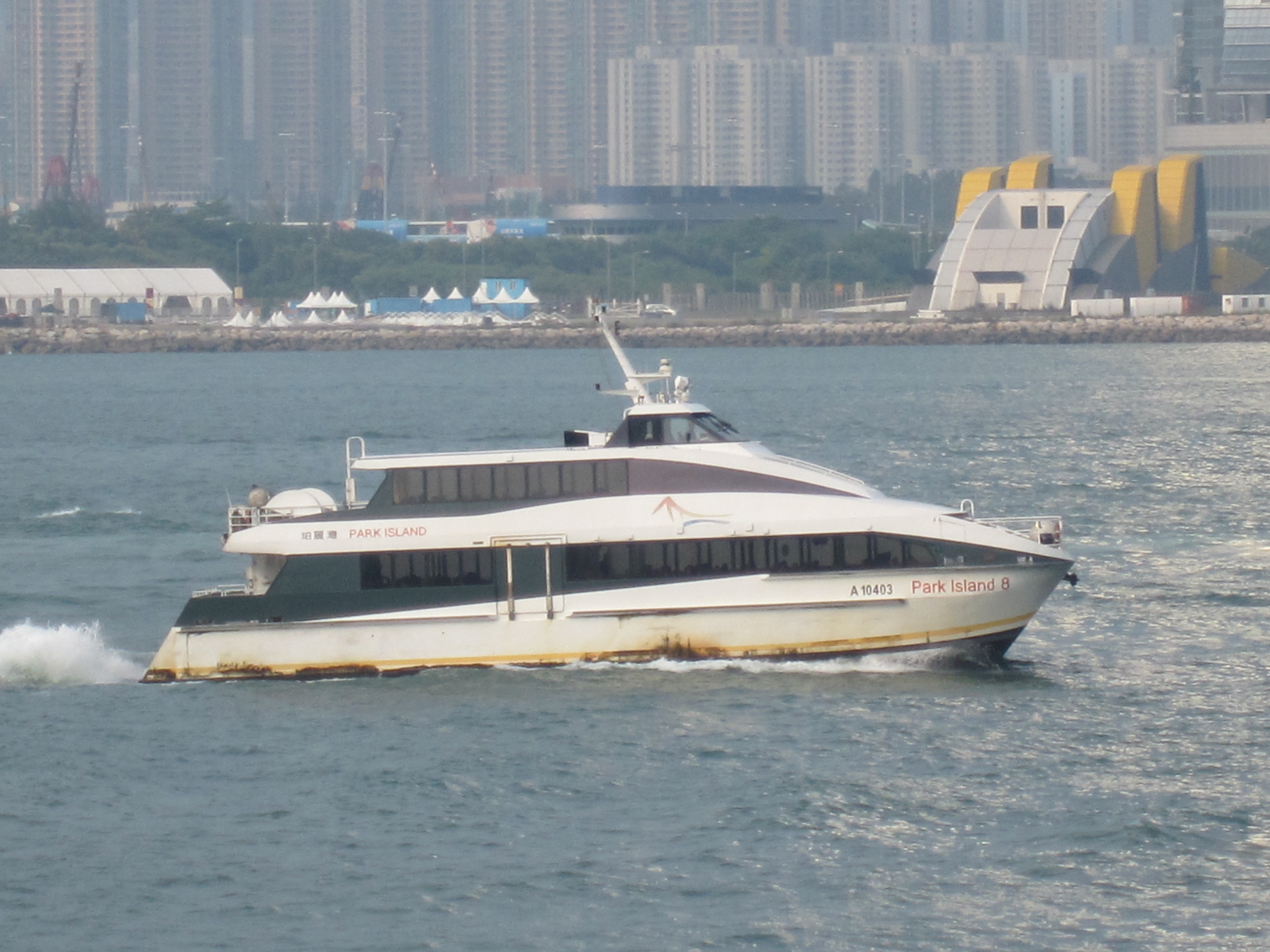
Park Island 8, a ferry operated by Park Island Transport Co., Ltd.

=== Road ===
Although the Hong Kong government originally claimed it would be "physically impossible" to give the island a road connection via the Lantau Link, this was disproved with the beginning of the construction of Park Island. The island is now connected to Tsing Yi by the Tsing Ma Bridge (a suspension bridge), and to Lantau Island by the Kap Shui Mun Bridge (a cable-stayed bridge). Both bridges are part of the Lantau Link.

Park Island Transport Co., Ltd. operates bus services from Park Island to Tsing Yi MTR station, Kwai Fong Metroplaza, Hong Kong International Airport, Tsuen Wan West and Tsuen Wan (close to the Tsuen Wan MTR station).

Starting from 3 July 2008, urban taxis were permitted access into Ma Wan between 8 pm and 7 am the following morning to meet residents' transport needs. From 14 December 2012, urban taxis were permitted access into Ma Wan 24 hours daily.

Private vehicles are generally not permitted to enter the island, an arrangement which also exists in Discovery Bay on the nearby Lantau Island; however a permit can be requested from the Transport Department of Hong Kong. Minibuses are not allowed, but the Park Island management company operates cars in case of emergency or special situations, though their availability is not guaranteed. Lorries may enter the island between 10 am to 4 pm daily without the need for a special permit.

=== Water ===
There are several ferry piers on the island: Park Island Ferry Pier on the northeast, one on the old Tin Liu village on the west (formerly hosting Sham Tseng ferries), Man Wan Public Pier on the southwest at Ma Wan Main Street Village, Tai Pai Tsui Pier on the south of the island facing Tang Lung Chau, one on the north of the island used for the garbage removal, one on the southeast side (but on a Government land not open).

Park Island Transport Co., Ltd. operates ferry services between Park Island and Central Piers (Pier 2). Another route to Tsuen Wan Pier (near Tuen Ma Tsuen Wan West station) is also available.

== Education ==
Ma Wan is in Primary One Admission (POA) School Net 62, which includes schools in Tsuen Wan and areas nearby. The net includes multiple aided schools and one government school, Hoi Pa Street Government Primary School.
