= Kap Shui Mun =

Coordinates: 22°20′35″N 114°3′23″E

- Traditional Chinese: 汲水門
Transcriptions
Yue: Cantonese
- Yale Romanization: Kāp séui mùhn
- Jyutping: Kap^{1} seoi^{2} mun^{4}

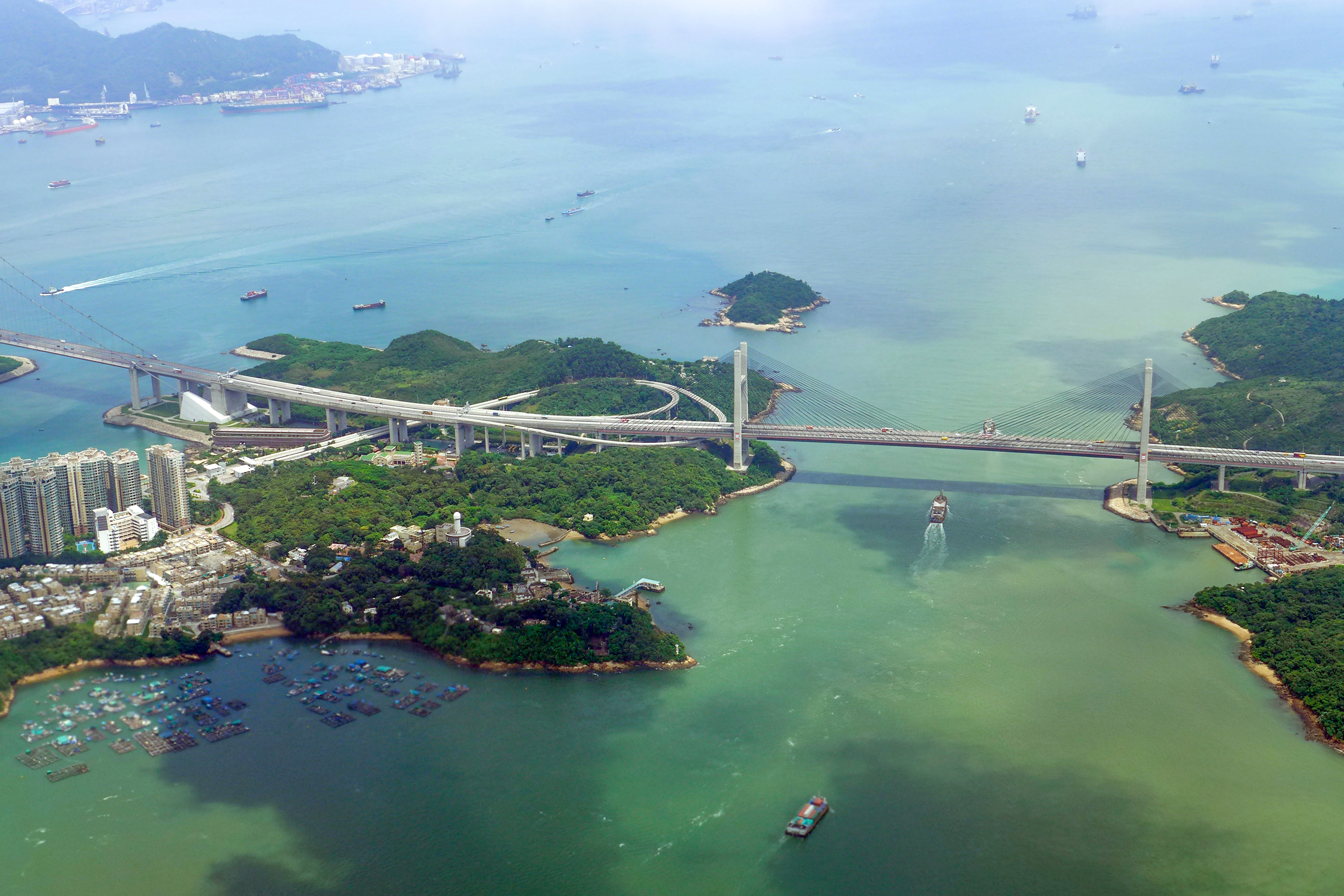
Kap Shui Mun, viewed from the air. Lantau Island is on the right side

Kap Shui Mun (Chinese: 汲水門) or Throat Gates (historically spelled Capsuimoon) is the channel between Lantau Island and Ma Wan in Hong Kong. It is part of major sea route along the coast of South China, from Victoria Harbour to the Pearl River. It joins north with Urmston Road. Kap Shui Mun Bridge, part of Route 8, spans the channel.

== Name ==
The original Chinese name of Kap Shui Mun is gap shui mun (急水門), the gate of fast-moving water. This exactly describes the current of the channel. The name 'fast-moving water' was associated with accidents for ships and boats. To remove this malign influence, it was renamed to a title with similar sound, kap shui mun (汲水門), meaning 'water-fetching gate'. For Chinese, water represents fortune and wealth.

== See also ==
- Tang Lung Chau
- Tsing Chau Tsai Peninsula
