= Park Island =

Housing estate on Ma Wan, Hong Kong

Coordinates: 22.3525°N 114.0607°E

- Traditional Chinese: 珀麗灣
- Simplified Chinese: 珀丽湾
Transcriptions
Standard Mandarin
- Hanyu Pinyin: Pò Lì Wān
Yue: Cantonese
- Jyutping: Paak3 lai6 waan1

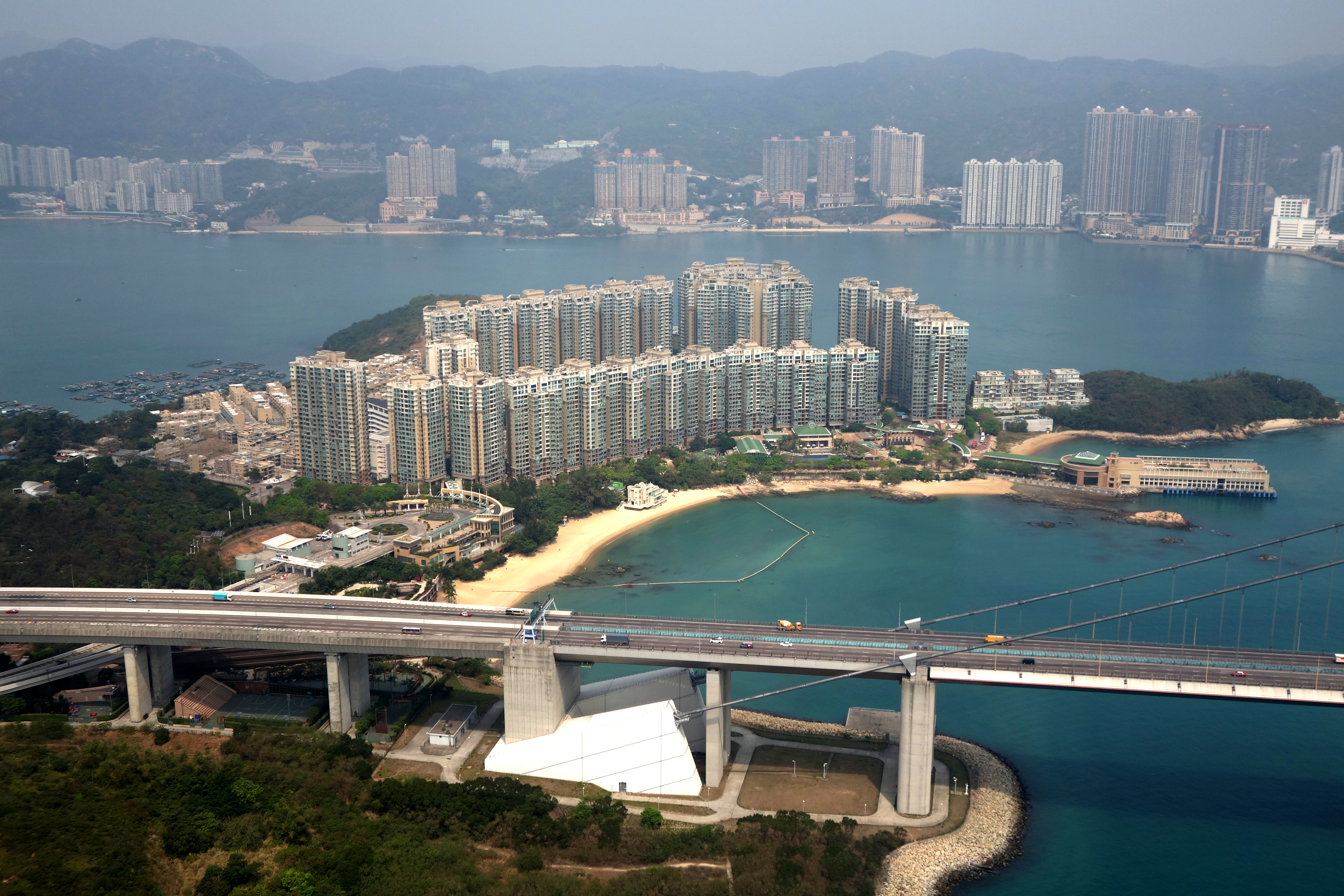
Aerial view of Ma Wan, with the junction between Ma Wan Viaduct and Tsing Ma Bridge is in the foreground

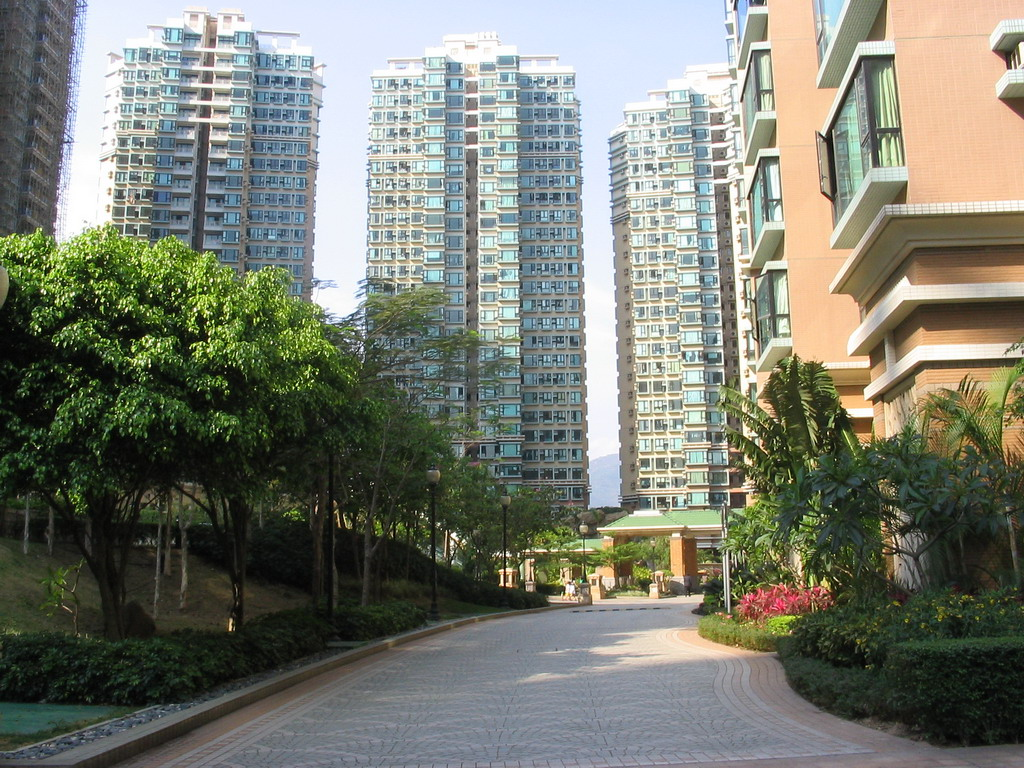
Park Island Phase 2

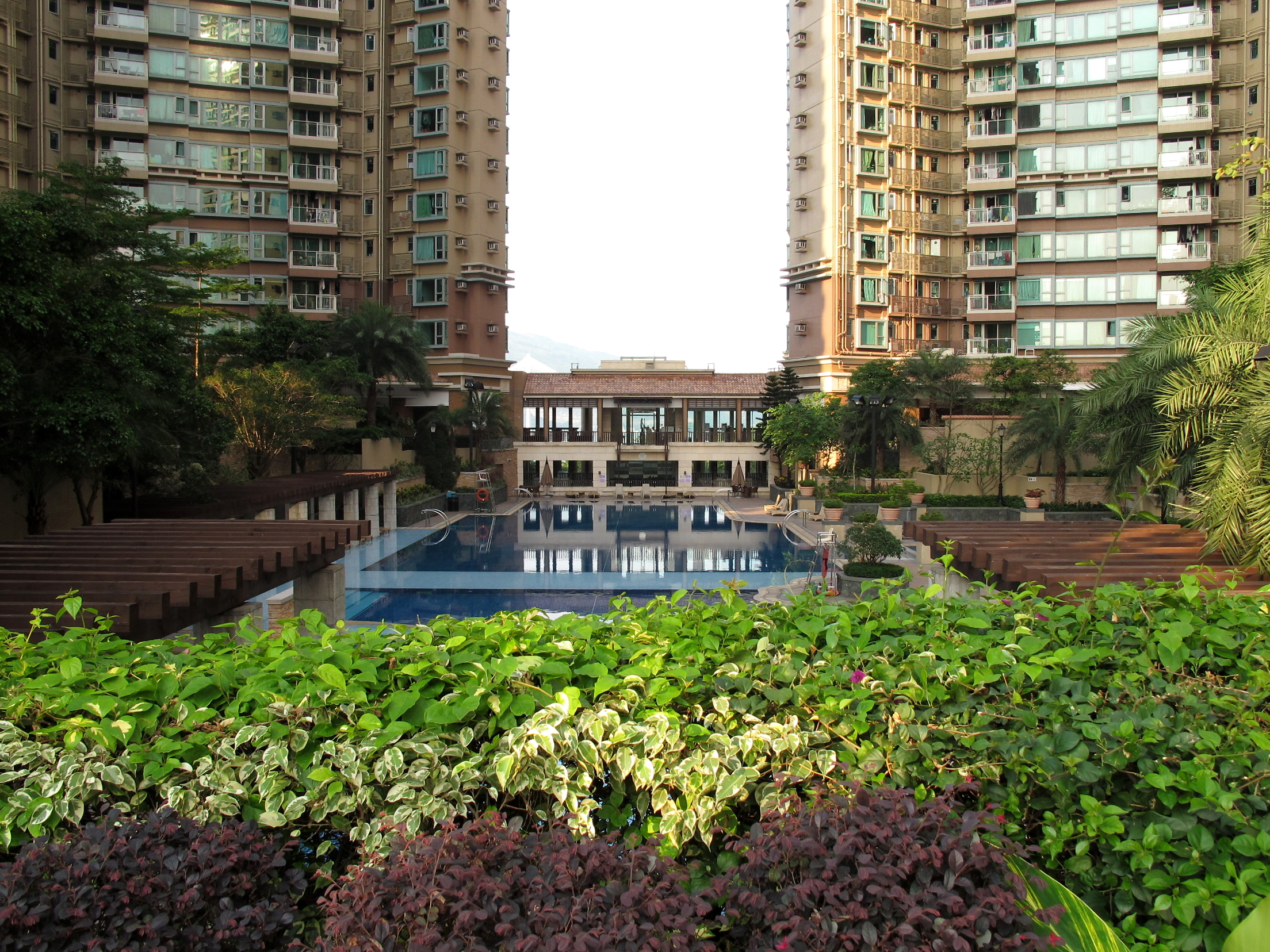
Park Island Phase 5 Swimming Pool

Logo of Park Island

Park Island is a private housing estate located at Ma Wan, an island in Tsuen Wan, New Territories, Hong Kong. It was mainly developed by Sun Hung Kai Properties as part of the Ma Wan Development joint venture project and completed from 2002 to 2006 in six phases. There are around 10,000 to 15,000 residents.

== Phases ==
- Phase 1 comprises 2,569 units completed in August 2002. Sales started in August 2002.
- Phase 3 comprises 1,446 units completed during the second half of 2004. Sales started in June 2004.
- Phases 5 and 6 contain nine blocks of low-to-medium-rise apartment blocks. Sale for Phase 5 started in August 2006.

== Education ==
Ma Wan is in Primary One Admission (POA) School Net 62, which includes multiple aided schools (operated independently but funded with government money) and two government schools: Hoi Pa Street Government Primary School (海壩街官立小學) and Tsuen Wan Government Primary School (荃灣官立小學).

== Transport ==
Similar to the Lantau Island private housing estate Discovery Bay, Park Island has its own shuttle bus and ferry routes operated by Park Island Transport Company Limited to Tsuen Wan, Tsing Yi, Kwai Fong, Kowloon Station, Hong Kong International Airport, and Central.

=== Bus routes ===
- NR330: Park Island ←→ Tsing Yi station
- NR331: Ma Wan (Pak Yan Road) ←→ Tsuen Wan station
- NR331S: Ma Wan (Pak Yan Road) ←→ Tsuen Wan (Nina Tower) Bus Terminus
- NR332: Park Island ←→ Kwai Fong Metroplaza
- NR334: Park Island ←→ Hong Kong International Airport (Passenger Terminal)
- NR338S: Park Island ←→ Central Piers
- 230R: Ma Wan (Pak Yan Road) ←→ Kowloon Station

=== Ferry routes ===
- Park Island ←→ Central Piers (Pier 2)
- Park Island ←→ Tsuen Wan Pier (near West Rail Tsuen Wan West station).

== Gallery ==
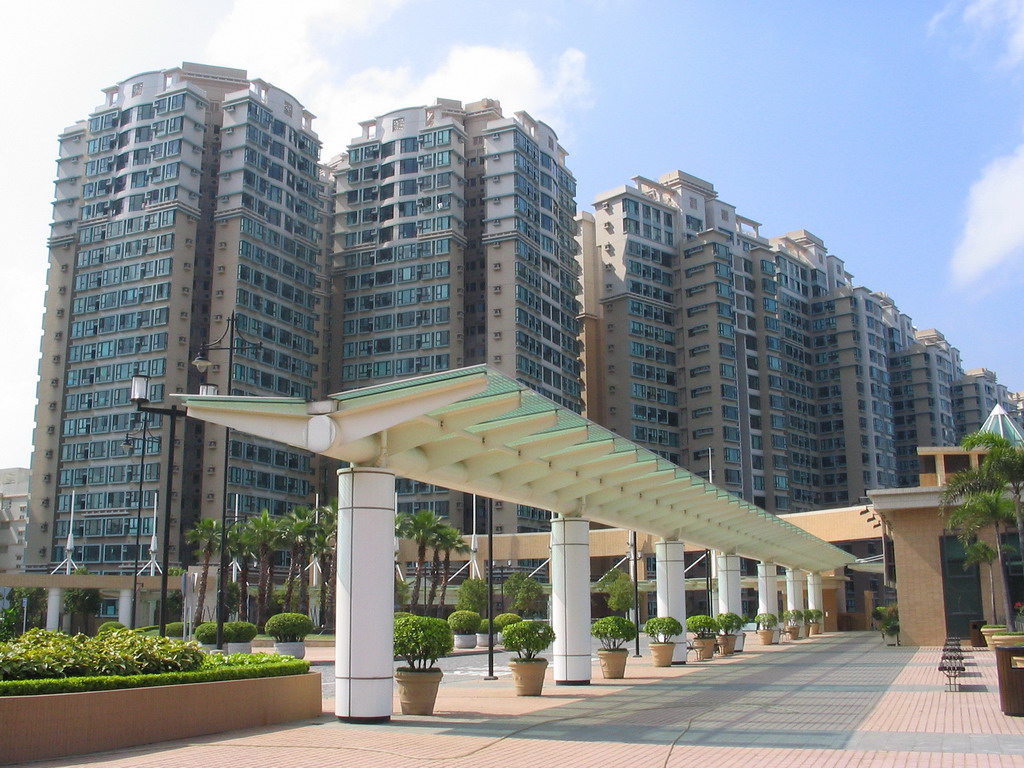
Bus stop

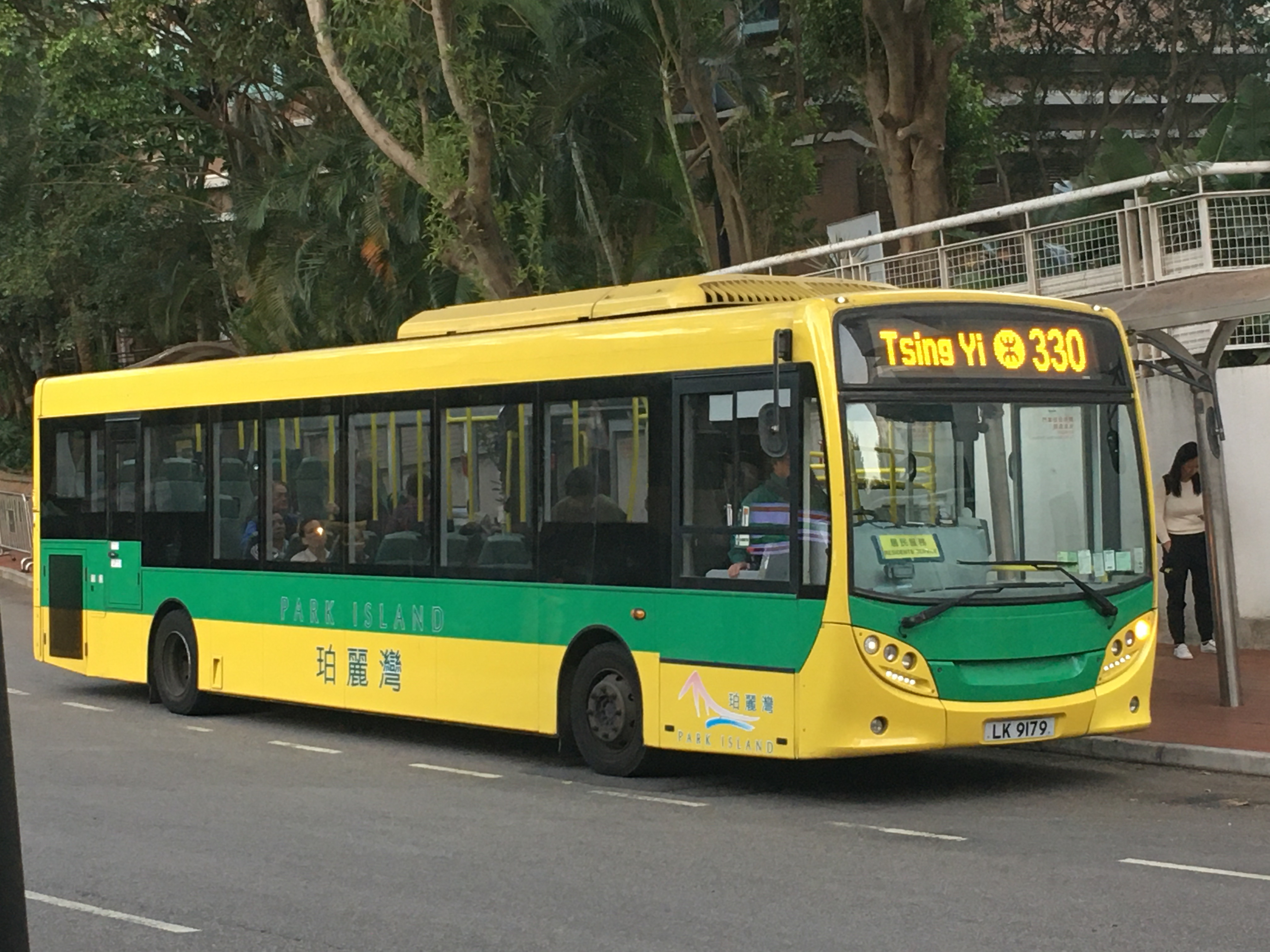
Shuttle bus

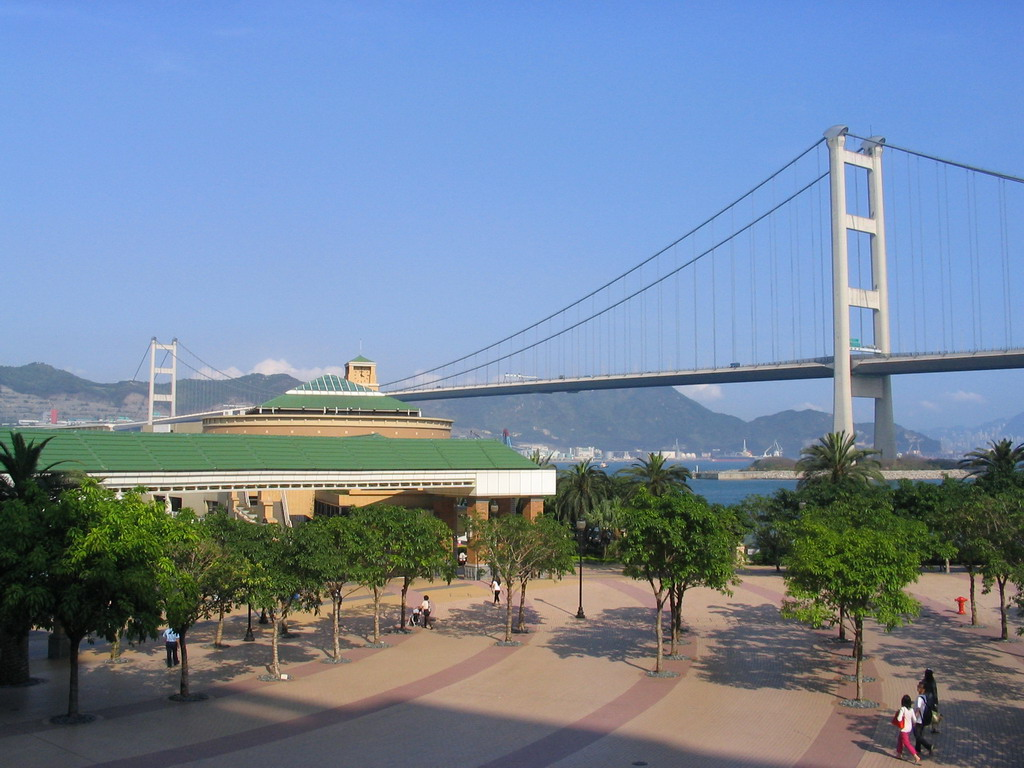
Shell Si Plazza

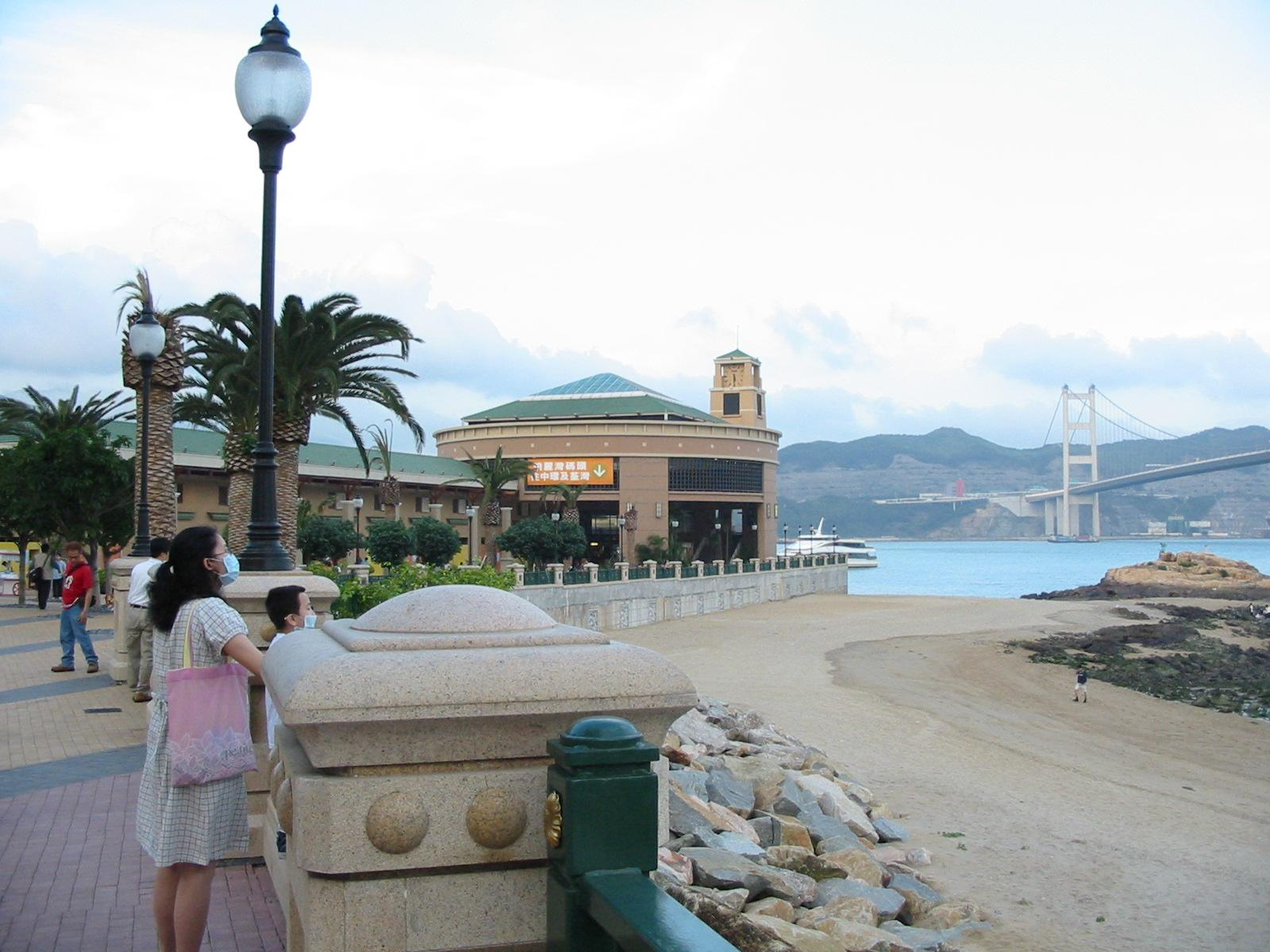
Ferry pier to Central

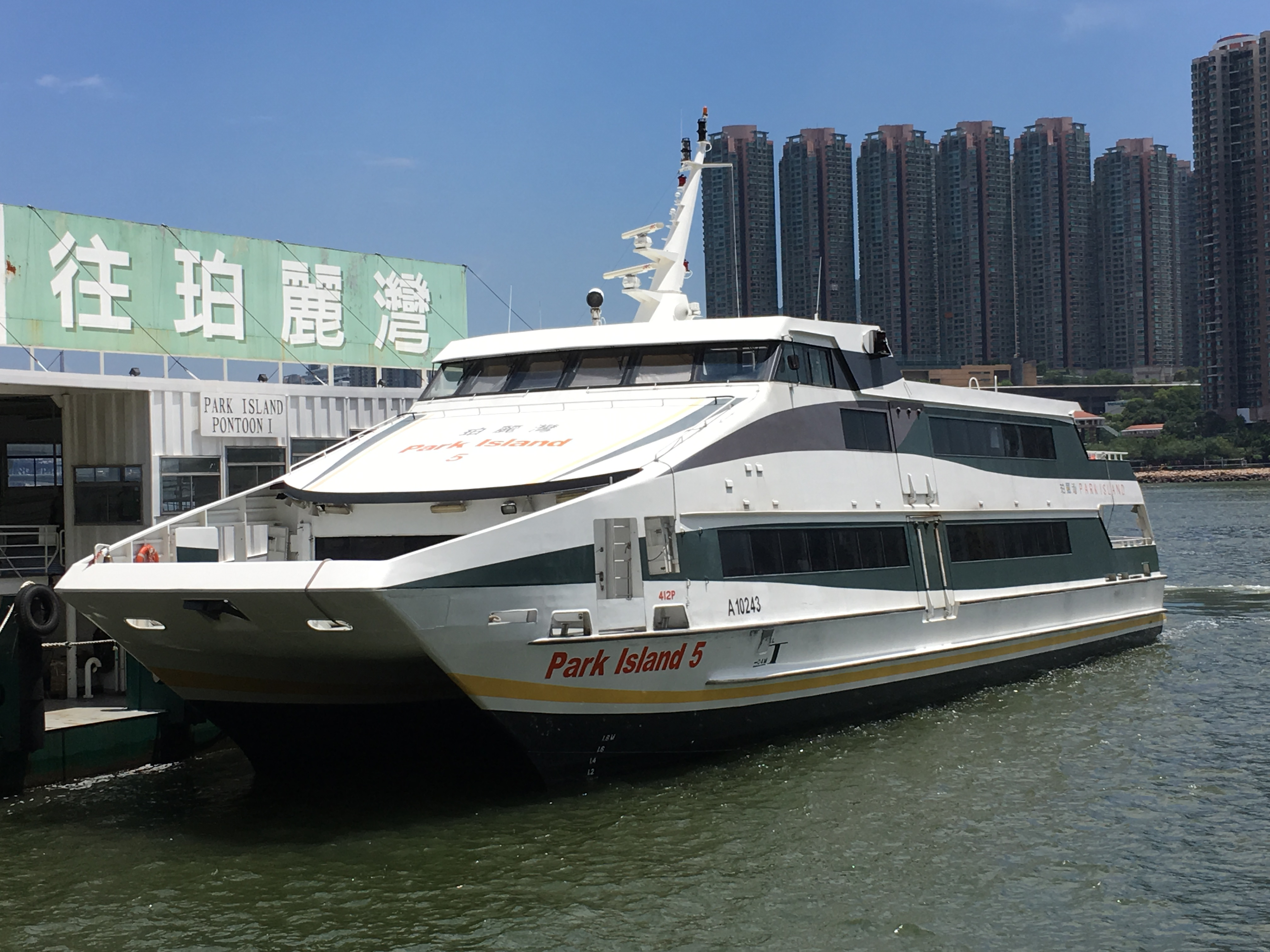
Ferry Service

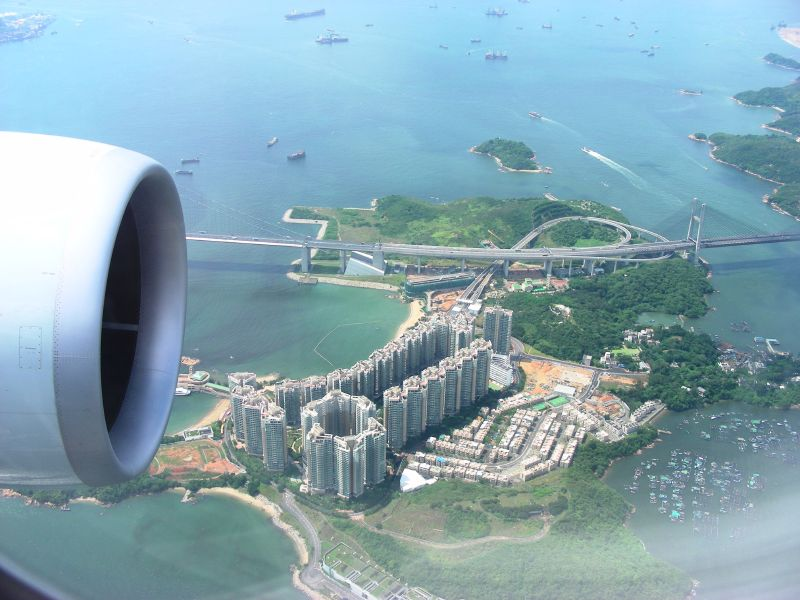
Aerial photo of Ma Wan. The high rises are the Park Island housing estates.
