= List of lighthouses in China =

This is a list of lighthouses in the People's Republic of China, which includes mainland China and the two special administrative regions of Hong Kong and Macau.

== Lighthouses in Mainland China ==
| Name | Year built | Location & coordinates | Light characteristic | Focal height (metres) | NGA no. | Admiralty no. | Range (nml) |
|---|---|---|---|---|---|---|---|
| Báijiéshān Lighthouse | 1883 | Zhejiang | Al Fl WR 60s | 75 | 112-18884 | P3738 | 22 |
| Báilóngwěi Lighthouse | 1966 | | Fl W 4s | 90 | 112-20095 | P3316.1 | 18 |
| Baishamen Lighthouse | 2000 | Haikou | Fl W 6s | 78 | 112-20131 | F3347.95 | 18 |
| Banyangjiao Lighthouse | 1904 | Zhoushan Island | Fl W 3s | 19.5 | 112-18880 | P3740 | 14 |
| Bàohǔjiǎo Lighthouse | 1962 | Wenchang | Fl W 6s | 54 | 112-20128 | P3348.3 | 18 |
| Běihuángchéngdǎo Lighthouse | 1980 | Changdao County | Fl(2) W 15s | 171 | 112-18568 | P3892.5 | 25 |
| Běijǐdǎo Lighthouse | 1990 | Rui'an | Fl(3) W 20s | 135 | 112-19086 | P3650 | 25 |
| Běishìdǎo Lighthouse | 1995 | | Iso W 2s | 180 | 112-20122 | P3348.35 | 15 |
| Běiyuányǔ Lighthouse | 2001 | Dongtou District | Fl(3) W 10s | 43 | 112-19076 | P3660.4 | 16 |
| Beiyushan Lighthouse | 1895 | Yushan Island | Fl(2) W 20s | 103 | 112-18982 | P3682 | 25 |
| Běizhángshān Lighthouse | 1998 | Changdao County | Fl W 10s | 102 | 112-18536 | P3894 | 22 |
| Biàndànjiāo Lighthouse | 2004 | Shengsi Islands | Fl WR 3s | 9 | 112-18877.5 | P3740.8 | 18 |
| Biǎojiǎo Lighthouse | 1992 | Haojiang District | Fl W 8s | 61 | 112-19208 | P3588 | 20 |
| Bīngmǎjiǎo Lighthouse | 1995 | | Fl W 6s | 71 | 112-20152 | P3339 | 22 |
| Bo'ao Lighthouse | 2011 | Bo’ao | Fl(3) W 24s | 81 | 112-20212 | P3348.46 | 22 |
| Chaoliandao Lighthouse | 1903 | Laoshan | Fl W 10s | 80 | 112-18668 | P3814 | 24 |
| Chéngshānjiǎo Lighthouse | 1950 | Rongcheng | L Fl (2) W 20s | 60 | 112-18640 | P3864 | 25 |
| Chēniúshān Lighthouse | 1987 | Lanshan District | Fl W 12s | 87 | 112-18756 | P3806 | 24 |
| Chìguā Jiāo Lighthouse | 2015 | Johnson South Reef | Fl W 8s | 52 | 112-20290.12 | F2823.21 | |
| Ciangxingdǎo Lighthouse | 1932 | Changxing Island | Fl W 25s | 199 | 112-18334 | P3983 | 25 |
| Dàfàngjī Lighthouse | 1996 | | Fl W 6s | 138 | 112-19996 | P3404 | 18 |
| Dàgǎng Dōngkǒunán Lighthouse | | Liaoning | Iso R 12s | 11 | 112-18260 | P4020 | 6 |
| Dagong Dao Lighthouse | 1988 | , | Fl W 5s | 131 | 112-18672 | P3818 | 15 |
| Dàgū Lighthouse | 1978 | Bohai Sea | Fl W 10s | 36 | 112-18500 | P3908 | 17 |
| Dagushan Lighthouse | 1992 | Wafangdian | Fl W 20s | 79 | 112-18334.3 | P3982 | 20 |
| Dàjíshān Lighthouse | 1994 | Islands of Shanghai | Fl(2) W 10s | 92 | 112-18868 | P3748 | 20 |
| Dàmiàodūn Lighthouse | 2005 | Gulf of Tonkin | Fl W 4s | 39 | 112-20093.5 | P3319.78 | 18 |
| Dàpéngshān Lighthouse | 1906 | Jintang Island | Fl(3) W 10s | 87 | 112-18912 | P3716.4 | 16 |
| Dàqiáodǎo Lighthouse | | Qingdao | Fl(2) W 5s | 18 | 112-18684 | P3822 | 15 |
| Dasanshandǎo Lighthouse | 1905 | Dashan Island | Fl W 10s | 81 | 112-18220 | P4058 | 23 |
| Dàxīngshān Lighthouse | 1996 | Huidong County | Fl W 13s | 218 | 112-19288 | P3581.298 | 24 |
| Dàzhàyán Lighthouse | 2000 | Hui'an County | Fl W 15s | 75 | 112-19141 | P3627 | 18 |
| Dàzhúshān Lighthouse | 1980 | | Fl W 8s | 204 | 112-18560 | P3893.5 | 15 |
| Dézhōudǎo Lighthouse | 1997 | Dezhou Dao | Fl W 5s | 74 | 112-19216 | P3591 | 18 |
| Diaolongzui Lighthouse | 1998 | Huludao | Fl (2+1) W 20s | 41 | 112-18387 | P3964 | 18 |
| Dōngjīdǎo Lighthouse | 1959 | | Fl(2) W 6s | 91 | 112-18983 | P3681 | 16 |
| Dongmen Lighthouse | 1916 | Xiangshan County | | | | | |
| Dōngtíngshān Lighthouse | 1907 | Zhejiang | Fl W 10s | 55 | 112-18936 | P3712 | 20 |
| Dōngxiángdǎo Lighthouse | 1989 | Pingtan County | Fl(3) W 10s | 48 | 112-19134 | P3632.3 | 16 |
| Gǎn'ēnjiǎo Lighthouse | 1996 | Dongfang | Fl W 6s | 47 | 112-20184 | P3357.5 | 18 |
| Gap Rock Lighthouse | 1892 | Wenwei Zhou | L Fl W 6s | 43 | 112-19590 | P3515 | 19 |
| Gōngshān Lighthouse | 2005 | Zhejiang | Fl W 10s | 100 | 112-18892.3 | P3717.754 | 18 |
| Guǎntóulíng Lighthouse | 1933 | Beihai | Fl W 3s | 129 | 112-20092 | P3320 | 18 |
| Guānyīnjiǎo Lighthouse | | Danzhou | Fl(3) W 9s | 60 | 112-20156 | P3338.4 | 18 |
| Guìshān Lighthouse | 1998 | Wanshan Qundao | Fl W 5s | 57 | 112-19618 | P3521.2 | 18 |
| Gǔléitóu Lighthouse | 1993 | Gulei Town | Fl(2) W 10s | 114 | 112-19200 | P3603 | 24 |
| Hǎilǘdǎo Lighthouse | 1990 | | Fl W 5s | 71 | 112-18636 | P3866 | 15 |
| Hǎijiāo Lighthouse | 2007 | Pudong | Fl W 6s | 58 | 112-18864 | P3747.4 | 16 |
| Hǎimāozǐtóu Lighthouse | 1980 | Rongcheng | Fl W 12s | 75 | 112-18648 | P3862 | 25 |
| Héngshā Lighthouse | 2001 | Hengsha Dao | Fl W 8s | 57 | 112-18829 | P3754.69 | 18 |
| Hóngkǎn Lighthouse | 1992 | Leizhou Peninsula | Fl W 8s | 67 | 112-20108 | P3336 | 21 |
| Hòujīdǎo Lighthouse | 1882 | Changdao County | Fl W 12s | 104 | 112-18556 | P3892 | 15 |
| Hóuyǔ Lighthouse | 2001 | Port of Xiamen | Fl W 6s | 33 | 112-19168 | P3615 | 16 |
| Huangbai Zui Lighthouse | 1996 | Dalian | Al WR 10s | 95 | 112-18236 | P4010 | 20 |
| Huánhǎisì Lighthouse | 1997 | Suizhong County | Fl W 10s | 25 | 112-18390 | P3960 | 15 |
| Huāniǎoshān Lighthouse | 1870 | Zhoushan | Fl W 15s | 89 | 112-18872 | P3746 | 24 |
| Huáyáng Jiāo Lighthouse | 2015 | Cuarteron Reef | Fl W 8s | 52 | 112-20290.11 | F2825.16 | |
| Huludao Jiao Lighthouse | | Huludao | Fl(2) W 12s | 129 | 112-18380 | P3965.5 | 18 |
| Hutouyu Lighthouse | | Dongtou District | Fl(2) W 6s | 103 | 112-19084 | P3659 | 16 |
| Jiangxin Lighthouse | | | | | | | |
| Jiàowěi Jiǎo Lighthouse | 1995 | Leizhou Peninsula | Fl W 6s | 34 | 112-20104 | P3328 | 18 |
| Jiàowěi Wān Lighthouse | | Leizhou Peninsula | Fl R 5s | 39 | 112-20106 | P3332 | 15 |
| Jiǎzǐjiǎo Lighthouse | 2007 | Lufeng | Fl W 10s | 78 | 112-19272 | P3585 | 18 |
| Jigujiao Lighthouse | 2004 | Shanghai, | Fl W 5s | 52 | 112-18784 | P3753 | 24, 18 |
| Jīmíngdǎo Lighthouse | 1953 | Rongcheng | Fl W 10s | 77 | 112-18634 | P3867 | 15 |
| Jīngtáng Gǎng Lighthouse | | Laoting County | Fl(2) W 10s | 40 | 112-18494 | P3934 | 18 |
| Jìngzǐtóu Lighthouse | 1975 | Weihai | Fl W 15s | 92 | 112-18600 | P3876 | 25 |
| Jùnbìjiǎo Lighthouse | 1997 | Changjiang Li Autonomous County | Fl W 8s | 96 | 112-20160 | P3338.2 | 20 |
| Ju-Nui-San Lighthouse | | Shinan District | | | | | |
| Kāishāndǎo Lighthouse | 1995 | Xiangshui County | Fl W 5s | 47 | 112-18779.32 | P3798 | 18 |
| Kōngtóngdǎo Lighthouse | 1997 | Yantai | Fl W 15s | 78 | 112-18596 | P3878 | 20 |
| Kuíshāndǎo Lighthouse | | | Fl W 4s | 76 | 112-19091 | P3641.95 | 15 |
| Lǎoběishān Lighthouse | 2000 | Penglai District | Fl W 5s | 90 | 112-18558 | P3895.85 | 20 |
| Láoshāntóu Lighthouse | 1954 | Laoshan | Fl W 6s | 116 | 112-18664 | P3850.6 | 15 |
| Laotieshan Lighthouse | 1893 | Lüshunkou District | Fl(2) W 30s | 100 | 112-18312 | P3986 | 25 |
| Língāo Lighthouse | 1894 | Lingao County | Fl(3) + L Fl W 27s | 20 | 112-20148 | P3342 | 15 |
| Longteng Hangdao Lighthouse | 2007 | Donghai Island | Dir WRG 4s | 41 | 112-20014 | P3372.1 | 15 |
| Luò Yǔ Lighthouse | 1993 | | Fl W 3s | 79 | 112-19000 | P3670 | 16 |
| Luódòu Shā Lighthouse | 1997 | | Fl W 4s | 42 | 112-20110 | P3358.5 | 20 |
| Luòjiāshān Lighthouse | 1890 | Zhujiajian Island | Fl(3) WR 9s | 40 | 112-18932 | P3714 | 15 |
| Mácàihéng Lighthouse | | Dafeng District | Fl W 6.5s | 26 | 112-18779.85 | P3794.199 | 15 |
| Matijiao Lighthouse | 1904 | Qingdao | Fl W 8s | 9 | 112-18704 | P3832 | 12 |
| Mòyédǎo Lighthouse | 1956 | Rongcheng | Fl W 15s | 28 | 112-18652 | P3860 | 15 |
| Mulantou Lighthouse | 1995 | Wenchang | Fl(2) W 15s | 88 | 112-20124 | F3348.1 | 25 |
| Nán'àodǎo Lighthouse | 2009 | Nan'ao County | Fl W 8s | 77 | 112-19206.3 | P3587.74 | 18 |
| Nandaquan Lighthouse | 1995 | Jinzhou District | Fl(2) W 10s | 57 | 112-18225 | P4065 | 20 |
| Nándǐngxīng Lighthouse | | | Fl (2+1) W 9s | 129 | 112-18879.5 | P3740.055 | 15 |
| Nángǎng Lighthouse | | Haikou | L Fl R 5s | 39 | 112-20145 | P3343.3 | 15 |
| Nánpàotái Lighthouse | 2010 | Longhai District | Fl W 10s | 70 | 112-19150.7 | P3612.195 | 15 |
| Nánpēngdǎo Lighthouse | 1994 | Nan'ao County | Fl W 12s | 92 | 112-19206 | P3587.7 | 22 |
| Nánpéngdǎo Lighthouse | 1997 | | Fl W 9s | 191 | 112-19986 | P3405.6 | 20 |
| Nánshāntóu Lighthouse | 1991 | Qinhuangdao | Fl W 15s | 59 | 112-18408 | P3937 | 20 |
| Naozhou Lighthouse | 1904 | Naozhou Island | Fl W 5s | 103 | 112-20000 | P3359 | 26 |
| Niúshāndǎo Lighthouse | 1987 | Pingtan County | Fl(2) W 12s | 90 | 112-19136 | P3632 | 24 |
| Píngyǔ Lighthouse | 1998 | Wenzhou | Fl(2) W 12s | 62 | 112-19086.5 | P3649 | 18 |
| Pǔtúoshān Lighthouse | 1952 | Putuoshan | Fl W 4s | 74 | 112-18954 | P3714.148 | 18 |
| Qianliyan Lighthouse | 1979 | Qianliyan Island | Fl W 15 | 84 | 112-18660 | P3856 | 24 |
| Qiliyu lighthouse | 1997 | Zhenhai District | Fl W 5s | 52 | 112-18916 | P3716 | 18 |
| Qīngyǔ Lighthouse | 1875 | Xiamen Bay | Fl(4) W 20s | 41 | 112-19184 | P3610 | 18 |
| Qīngyǔ Lighthouse | | | Fl(2) W 6s | 54 | 112-19207 | P3587.62 | 15 |
| Qīngzhōu Lighthouse | 1997 | | Fl W 6s | 107 | 112-19290 | P3580.98 | 15 |
| Quézuī Lighthouse | 2010 | Changdao County | Fl W 10s | 75 | 112-18559.1 | P3895.22 | 15 |
| Qígānzuǐ Lighthouse | 1976 | Weihai | Fl W 12s | 23 | 112-18624 | P3871 | 16 |
| Qīmùjiǎo Lighthouse | 2004 | Longkou | Fl W 5s | 71 | 112-18532 | P3897 | 20 |
| Rizhao Lighthouse | 1985 | Rizhao | Fl W 8s | 39 | 112-18752 | P3808 | 18 |
| Róngshùtóu Dǎo Lighthouse | 1989 | Pearl River Delta | Fl W 8s | 55 | 112-19626 | P3521.35 | 18 |
| Shānbǎnzhōu Lighthouse | 1915 | Pearl River Delta | Fl W 5s | 32 | 112-19812 | P3466 | 18 |
| Shāngǒuhǒu Lighthouse | 1995 | Leizhou Peninsula | Fl(2) W 6s | 20 | 112-20112 | P3358 | 15 |
| Shatuozi Lighthouse | 1976 | Jinzhou District | Fl W 6s | 37 | 112-18228 | P4059 | 18 |
| Shéshān Lighthouse | 1871 | Shanghai | Fl W 6s | 70 | 112-18780 | P3762 | 22 |
| Shíbēishān Lighthouse | 1990 | Huilai County | Fl W 15s | 68 | 112-19264 | P3586 | 22 |
| Sìgèng Shā Lighthouse | 2007 | Dongfang | Fl(2) W 6s | 31 | 112-20162 | P3337.89 | 15 |
| Sūshāndǎo Lighthouse | 1982 | | Fl W 25s | 116 | 112-18656 | P3858 | 20 |
| Taiping Jiao Lighthouse | | Wafangdian | Fl W 15s | 35 | 112-18334.6 | P3981 | 20 |
| Taizishan Lighthouse | 1993 | Bayuquan District | Fl W 10s | 131 | 112-18335 | P3978 | 25 |
| Tángnǎoshān Lighthouse | 1996 | Hangzhou Bay | Fl(3) W 10s | 41 | 112-18892 | P3717 | 18 |
| Táohuādǎo Lighthouse | 1997 | Taohua Island | Fl(3) W 12s | 110 | 112-18940 | P3714.14 | 15 |
| Tiánwěijiǎo Lighthouse | 1955 | Jieshi | Fl W 7s | 83 | 112-19276 | P3584 | 18 |
| Tónggǔjiǎo Lighthouse | 1953 | Xiangzhou District | Fl(2) W 6s | 55 | 112-19779 | P3452 | 18 |
| Tónggǔzuǐ Lighthouse | 1989 | | Fl(2) W 8s | 140 | 112-20120 | P3348.4 | 18 |
| Wàidōngjǔ Lighthouse | | | Fl(2) W 10s | 53 | 112-18980 | P3689 | 16 |
| Wàikējiāo Lighthouse | 2010 | Dongtai | Fl W 5s | 26 | 112-18779.9 | P3794.172 | 15 |
| Wàizhèdǎo Lighthouse | | Lidao | Fl W 8s | 49 | 112-18644 | P3863 | 16 |
| Wéijiādǎo Lighthouse | 2007 | | Fl W 5s | 172 | 112-19984 | P3406 | 18 |
| Wéizhōudǎo Lighthouse | 2002 | Weizhou Island | Fl W 10s | 97 | 112-20096 | P3326 | 18 |
| Wǔtōng Lighthouse | 2010 | Xiamen Island | Fl(3) W 15s | 80 | 112-19175 | P3618.385 | 16 |
| Xiàlàngdāngdǎo Lighthouse | 1963 | | Fl(3) W 20s | 59 | 112-19012 | P3665 | 16 |
| Xiángzhījiǎo Lighthouse | 1993 | Shishi | Fl(3) W 15s | 51 | 112-19150 | P3620.8 | 16 |
| Xianjiǎo Lighthouse | 1987 | Dalian | Fl W 5s | 25 | 112-18222 | P4060 | 15 |
| Xiao Qingdao Lighthouse | 1904 | Shinan District | Fl R 6.5s | 28 | 112-18688 | P3826 | |
| Xiǎogōngdǎo Lighthouse | | | Fl(2) W 6s | 50 | 112-18670 | P3816 | 15 |
| Xiǎoguīshān Lighthouse | 1883 | Zhejiang | Fl(2) W 10s | 75 | 112-18904 | P3720 | 18 |
| Xiǎojīndǎo Lighthouse | 2013 | | Fl W 6s | 84 | 112-19980 | P3407 | 15 |
| Xiǎolongshāndǎo Lighthouse | 1932 | | Fl W 5s | 69 | 112-18316 | P3984 | 15 |
| Xiǎopútái Dǎo Lighthouse | 1953 | | Fl W 9s | 63 | 112-19605.5 | P3521.1 | 18 |
| Xiaoqushān Lighthouse | | Daishan County | Fl(4) W 15s | 160 | 112-18892.45 | P3718.81 | 15 |
| Xiǎozhúshāndǎo Lighthouse | 1951 | | Fl W 5s | 104 | 112-18564 | P3893 | 18 |
| Xiàsānxīngdǎo Lighthouse | 1993 | | Fl(3) W 20s | 79 | 112-18896 | P3734 | 22 |
| Xiōngdìyǔ Lighthouse | 1988 | Dongshan County | Fl(3) W 10s | 73 | 112-19205 | P3598 | 16 |
| Xītáishān Lighthouse | 1992 | | Fl W 4s | 143 | 112-19087 | P3648 | 18 |
| Xiùyīng Lighthouse | 1894 | Haikou | Fl(2) W 10s | 40 | 112-20132 | P3346 | 15 |
| Yángwōtóu Lighthouse | 1995 | Lianyun District | Fl(3) W 20s | 125 | 112-18760 | P3804 | 18 |
| Yángxiǎomāodǎo Lighthouse | 1991 | Beilun District | Fl(2) W 10s | 49 | 112-18956 | P3714.22 | 15 |
| Yángyǔ Lighthouse | 1994 | Tailu Town | Fl(2) W 6s | 101 | 112-19091.5 | P3641.2 | 16 |
| Yantai Mountain Lighthouse | 1988 | Yantai | Fl W 9s | 80 | 112-18572 | P3882 | 20 |
| Yīnggēzuǐ Lighthouse | 1992 | Ledong Li Autonomous County | Fl W 10s | 40 | 112-20188 | P3357 | 22 |
| Yuándǎo Lighthouse | 1925 | Dalian | Fl W 15s | 66 | 112-18212 | P4064 | 20 |
| Yùbāojiǎo Lighthouse | | | Fl(3) W 15s | 74 | 112-20146 | P3342.73 | 18 |
| Yúlínjiǎo Lighthouse | | Dongfang | Fl(2) W 6s | 62 | 112-20164 | P3337 | 18 |
| Yúxīngnǎo Lighthouse | 1872 | Daishan County | Fl(2) W 20s | 27 | 112-18908 | P3716.8 | 15 |
| Zhàoběizuǐ Lighthouse | 1891 | Weihai | Fl W 8s | 29 | 112-18608 | P3868 | 15 |
| Zhēlàng Lighthouse | 2007 | Shanwei | Fl W 8s | 40 | 112-19280 | P3582 | 18 |
| Zhènhǎijiǎo Lighthouse | 1989 | Longhai District | Fl(2) W 6s | 110 | 112-19197 | P3607 | 24 |
| Zhongjiang Pagoda | | Wuhu | | | | | |
| Zhǔbì Jiāo Lighthouse | 2016 | Subi Reef | Fl W 5s | 55 | 112-20289.62 | F2825.02 | 22 |
| Zhúzhōu Lighthouse | | | Fl W 4s | 185 | 112-19594 | P3520 | 18 |

== Lighthouses in Hong Kong ==
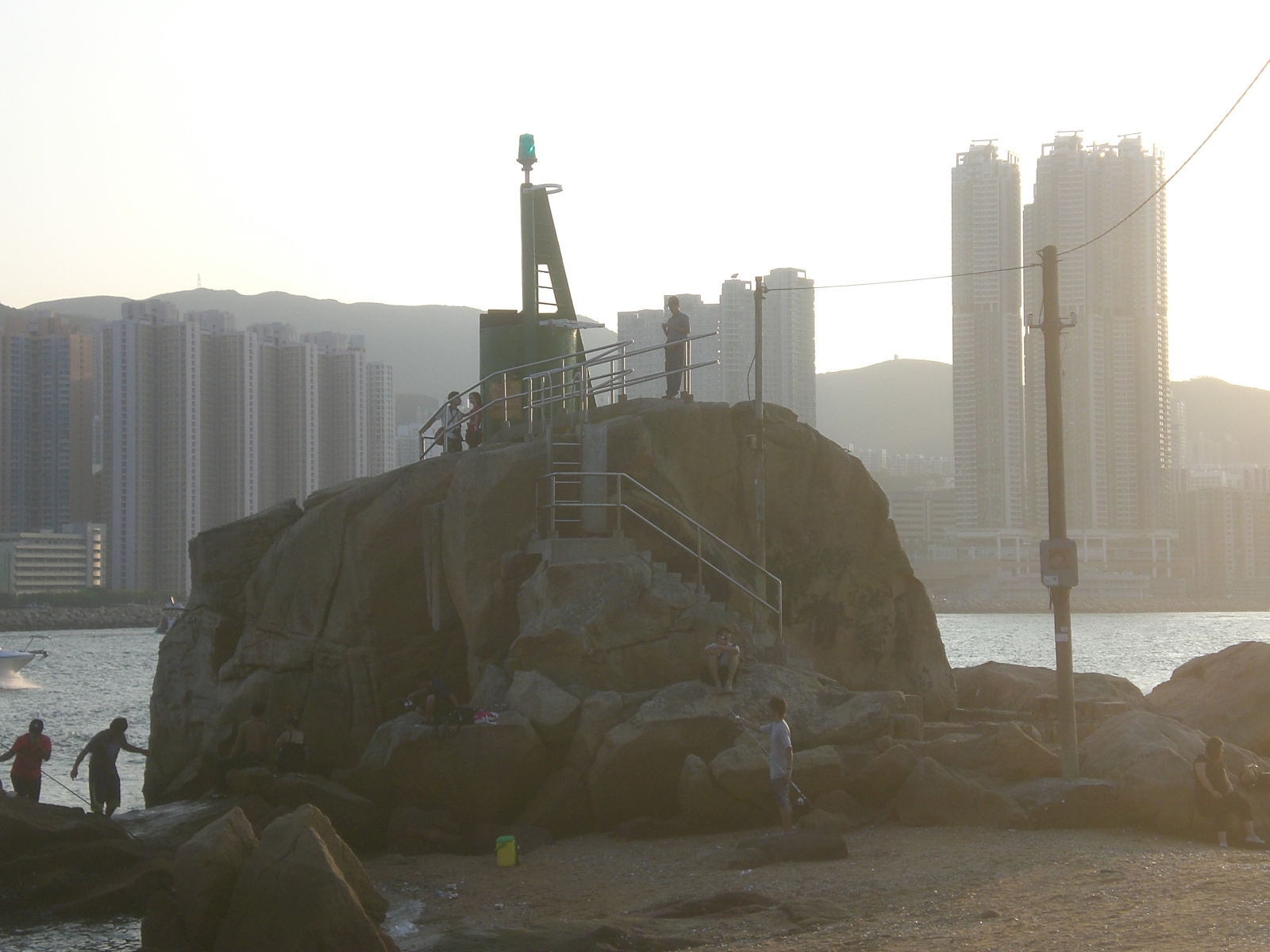
Lei Yue Mun Lighthouse in New Kowloon

Following the establishment of British Hong Kong as a trade port in 1841, the first lighthouses in Hong Kong were planned and built to assist international navigation. The first lighthouse to enter service was Cape D'Aguilar Lighthouse in April 1875, which was operated by lighthouse keepers who received specialist training in London and lived in the lighthouse in one-month shifts.

As of 2017, five lighthouse structures in Hong Kong that date from before the Second World War remain in operation: Cape D'Aguilar, Green Island (two lighthouses), Waglan, and Tang Lung Chau. All of them are listed heritage sites. Lei Yue Mun Lighthouse has also been in continuous operation since 1902, but the structure was rebuilt in the 1950s. In addition, Gap Island Lighthouse (also known as Mosquito Island, or Man Mei Chau from Cantonese 蚊尾洲, pronounced Wenwei Zhou in Mandarin), situated on an island due south from Hong Kong, was built in 1892 in collaboration between the British Hong Kong and Qing Empire governments; this lighthouse is now under Guangdong administration and is fully-automated using solar power.

| Name | Image | Year built | Location & coordinates | Class of Light | Focal height (metres) | NGA number | Admiralty number | Range (nautical miles) |
|---|---|---|---|---|---|---|---|---|
| A Kung Ngam Lighthouse | | 1924 | A Kung Ngam | Fl R 5s | 11 | 112-19370 | P3570 | 11 |
| Cape D'Aguilar Lighthouse | | 1875 | Cape D'Aguilar | Fl W 15s | 60 | 112-19330 | P3576 | 20 |
| Fan Lau Lighthouse | | 1936 | Fan Lau | Fl W 5s | 20 | 112-19588 | P3524 | 14 |
| Fan Tsang Chau Lighthouse | | 1977 | Conic Island | Fl(2) W 6s | 6 | 112-19300 | P3580.95 | 5 |
| Fo Yeuk Chau Lighthouse | | 1974 | Magazine Island | Fl W 1.5s | 8 | 112-19437 | P3577.6 | 5 |
| Green Island Lighthouse | | 1875 | Green Island | Fl W 10s | 37 | 112-19460 | P3538 | 16 |
| Cape Collinson Lighthouse | | 1876 | Hong Kong Island | Fl(2) WR 10s | 50 | 112-19355 | P3572 | 15 (white), 12 (red) |
| Kau Yi Chau lighthouse | | 1968 | Kau Yi Chau | Fl(2) WR 6s | 9 | 112-19504 | P3537.6 | 11 (white), 8 (red) |
| Lam Tong Mei Lighthouse | | 1921 | Tathong Point, Tung Lung Chau | Fl(3) WR 10s | 56 | 112-19342 | P3574 | 19 (white), 10 (red) |
| Lan Kok Tsui Lighthouse | | 1990s | Black Point, Lung Kwu Tan | Fl(3) W 10s | 131 | 112-19746 | P3526.2 | 15 |
| Lei Yue Mun Lighthouse | | 1902 | Lei Yue Mun Village, Sam Ka Tsuen, New Kowloon | Q R | 5 | 112-19381 | P3569 | 2 |
| Lo Chau Lighthouse | | 1970 | Beaufort Island | Fl WR 3s | 37, 5 | 112-19415 | P3576.8 | 10 (white), 8 (red) |
| Lung Kwu Chau Lighthouse | | 1921 | Lung Kwu Chau | Fl W 5s | 53 | 112-19742 | P3526 | 15 |
| Ma Wan Fairway Lighthouse | | 1990s | Ting Kau | Oc WRG 8s | 28 | 112-19512 | P3532.2 | 8 (white), 4 (red), 4 (green) |
| Ngan Chau Lighthouse | | 1972 | Round Island | Al Fl WRW 10s | 28 | 112-19420 | P3577.1 | 11 (white), 8 (red) |
| Pak Kwo Chau Lighthouse | | 1979 | North Ninepin Island | Fl WR 10s | 44 | 112-19334 | P3575.6 | 10 (white), 7 (red) |
| Po Toi Lighthouse | | 1970 | Po Toi | Fl W 10s | 67 | 112-19405 | P3576.6 | 18 |
| Sha Chau Lighthouse | | | Sha Chau | Fl(4) W 10s | 28 | 112-19726 | P3525.5 | 10 |
| Shek Ngau Chau Lighthouse | | 1972 | Shek Ngau Chau | Fl W 4s | 26 | 112-19292 | P3578.3 | 12 |
| Tai Long Pai Lighthouse | | 1964 | Tai Long Pai | Fl(4) R 15s | 14 | 112-19349 | P3575.4 | 5 |
| Tang Lung Chau Lighthouse | | 1912 | Tang Lung Chau | Fl W 5s | 37 | 112-19520 | P3530.6 | 18 |
| Waglan Lighthouse | | 1893 | Waglan Island | Fl(2) W 20s | 69 | 112-19326 | P3578 | 24 |
| Wong Mau Chau Lighthouse | | 1978 | Wong Mau Chau | Fl R 5s | 23 | 112-19296 | P3578.4 | 5 |
| Yuen Kok Lighthouse | | 1960s | Yuen Kok, Lamma Island | Fl W 5s | 35 | 112-19412 | P3577.2 | 10 |

== Lighthouses in Macau ==
| Name | Image | Year built | Location & coordinates | Class of Light | Focal height (metres) | NGA number | Admiralty number | Range (nautical miles) |
|---|---|---|---|---|---|---|---|---|
| Guia Lighthouse | | 1865 | Guia Fortress, São Lázaro | Fl(2) W 10s | 108 | 112-19640 | P3416 | 16 |
| Pedra da Areca Lighthouse | | | Pedra d'Areca | Fl W 5s | 8 | 112-19708 | P3442 | 3 |
| Ponta de Ká-Hó Lighthouse | | 1923 | Ká-Hó Port, Coloane | Fl W 4s | 48 | 112-19720 | P3420 | 12 |

== See also ==
- Lists of lighthouses and lightvessels
- China Maritime Safety Administration
- Landscape crisis of the Guia Fortress
