= Lamma Channel =

Lamma Channel (Chinese: 博寮海峽) may refer to:

- East Lamma Channel, a waterway on the east of Lamma Island in Hong Kong
- West Lamma Channel, a waterway on the west of Lamma Island in Hong Kong
