= Wusong =

Subdistrict of Baoshan, Shanghai, China

Coordinates: 31°22′30″N 121°30′0″E

Wusong 吴淞区
- Subdistrict of China
- 1980–1988
- Location of Wusong on Shanghai.
- History
  - Established: 1980
  - Disestablished: 1988
Preceded by	Succeeded by
Yangpu District	Baoshan District, Shanghai
- Today part of: Part of the Baoshan District, Shanghai

Wusong
- Traditional Chinese: 吳淞
- Simplified Chinese: 吴淞
- Postal: Woosung
Transcriptions
Standard Mandarin
- Hanyu Pinyin: Wúsōng
- Wade–Giles: Wu-sung

Wusong, formerly romanized as Woosung, (Note: Variant spellings include Woo-Sung.) is a subdistrict of Baoshan in northern Shanghai. Prior to the city's expansion, it was a separate port town located 14 miles (23 km) down the Huangpu River from Shanghai's urban core.

== Name ==
Wusong is named for the Wusong River, a former name for Shanghai's Suzhou Creek. Suzhou Creek is now a tributary to the Huangpu River, emptying into it in Puxi across from Lujiazui and just north of the Bund. The Huangpu had previously been a tributary to the Wusong, but the two reversed their importance when a flood caused it to gain a number of the Wusong's former tributaries. The location where the Huangpu and Wusong meet was generally known as Wusongkou ("mouth of the Wusong"). As a result of an American railroader visiting the area in his sea captain days, it would also become the namesake for an unincorporated community in southwestern Ogle County, Illinois, northwest of Dixon.

== History ==
Wusong housed a Qing fortress protecting the entrance to Shanghai. It was captured by the British during the Battle of Woosung on 16 June 1842, amid the First Opium War. During the steamship era, it was the point of departure for large steamers bound for Shanghai. This position caused it to be the site of China's first telegraph wires and first railroad, both running to Shanghai along what is today the route of the Shanghai Metro's elevated Line 3. By 1900, it boasted a lighthouse and a "skeleton" teahouse, as well as a small squadron of war-junks (ty-mung) of the Imperial Chinese Navy. Tongji University was founded here in 1909.

In the opinion of some historians, the Battle of Shanghai represented the outbreak of World War II in Asia and Wusongkou was the scene of an all-out land, sea and air battle, as Imperial Japanese Marines landed here on 23 August 1937, and were attacked by Chinese Air Force Hawk III fighter-attack planes escorted by P-26/281 Peashooters; the intense dogfight between the Chinese fighters and IJN fighters from aircraft carriers Hōshō and Ryūjō resulted in several Chinese fighters shot down, while the Japanese lost two A4N fighters, each claimed by Capt. Liu Cuigang and Lt. John Huang, although Capt. Liu's victim managed to nurse his crippled A4N back to Ryūjō. Wusong was later the site of an internment camp for marines captured on Wake Island after the attack on Pearl Harbor over four years later.

Wusong became a district of Shanghai, before it was abolished in 1988 and incorporated into Baoshan District.

== Landmarks ==
The Wusung Radio Tower is a 321-metre-tall guyed mast situated at Wusong near Shanghai. The Wusung Radio Mast was built in the 1930s and was at the time of inauguration the world's second-tallest architectural structure after the Empire State Building.

== See also ==
- Woosung, Illinois
- Woosung Road
- Wenzaobang, also known as Wusong Creek
- Suzhou Creek, formerly known as the Wusong River
