= Sulphur Channel =

Channel near Hong Kong island

Coordinates: 22°16′56″N 114°7′0″E

- Traditional Chinese: 硫磺海峽
Transcriptions
Standard Mandarin
- Hanyu Pinyin: Liúhuáng Hǎixiá
Yue: Cantonese
- Jyutping: Lau4 Wong4 Hoi2 Haap8

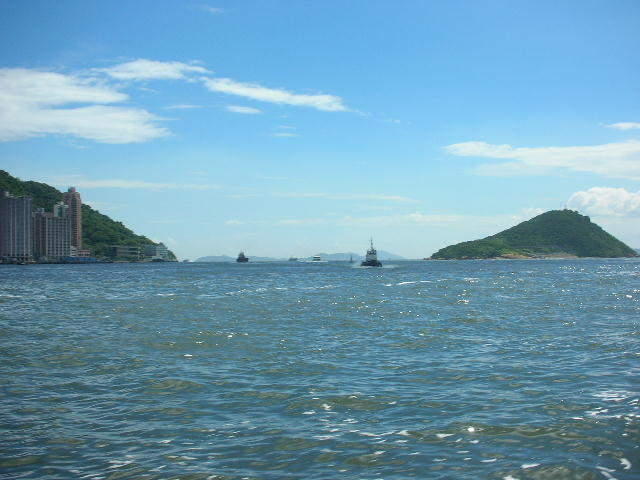
Sulphur Channel

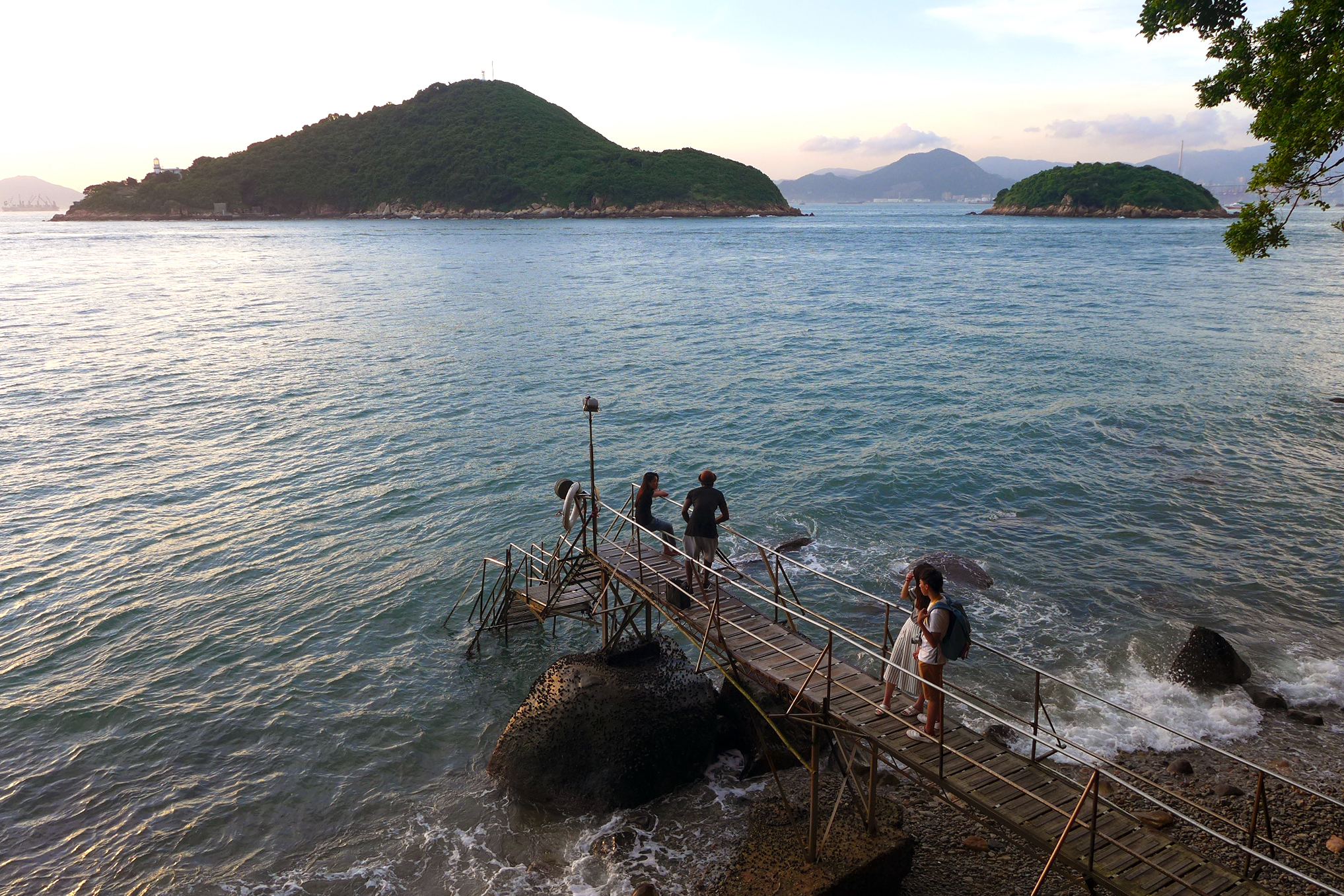
Green Island and Little Green Island viewed across Sulphur Channel. The Sai Wan Swimming Shed is visible in the foreground.

The Sulphur Channel is a narrow inshore passage between Green Island and the northwest tip (West Point) of Hong Kong Island in Hong Kong. The Sulphur Channel is mainly used by small craft and inter-island ferries passing between Victoria Harbour and the East Lamma Channel.

The channel was named after HMS Sulphur, a bomb vessel commanded by Edward Belcher who took the first British survey to Hong Kong harbour on 25 January 1841. Captain Belcher left HMS Sulphur with a landing party on 26 January 1841, disembarked on the northern foreshore, and raised the Union Jack over Hong Kong at Possession Point (what is today Hollywood Road Park). After raising a toast to the Queen with his companions, he officially declared the island the property of Her Majesty Queen Victoria and a Colony of the British Empire.

In the 1990s, the Hong Kong Government had planned to reclaim the channel but withdrew later due to opposition from environmental concern groups.

== See also ==
- List of channels in Hong Kong
