= East Lamma Channel =

Channel near Hong Kong Island

- 東博寮海峽 (Chinese)
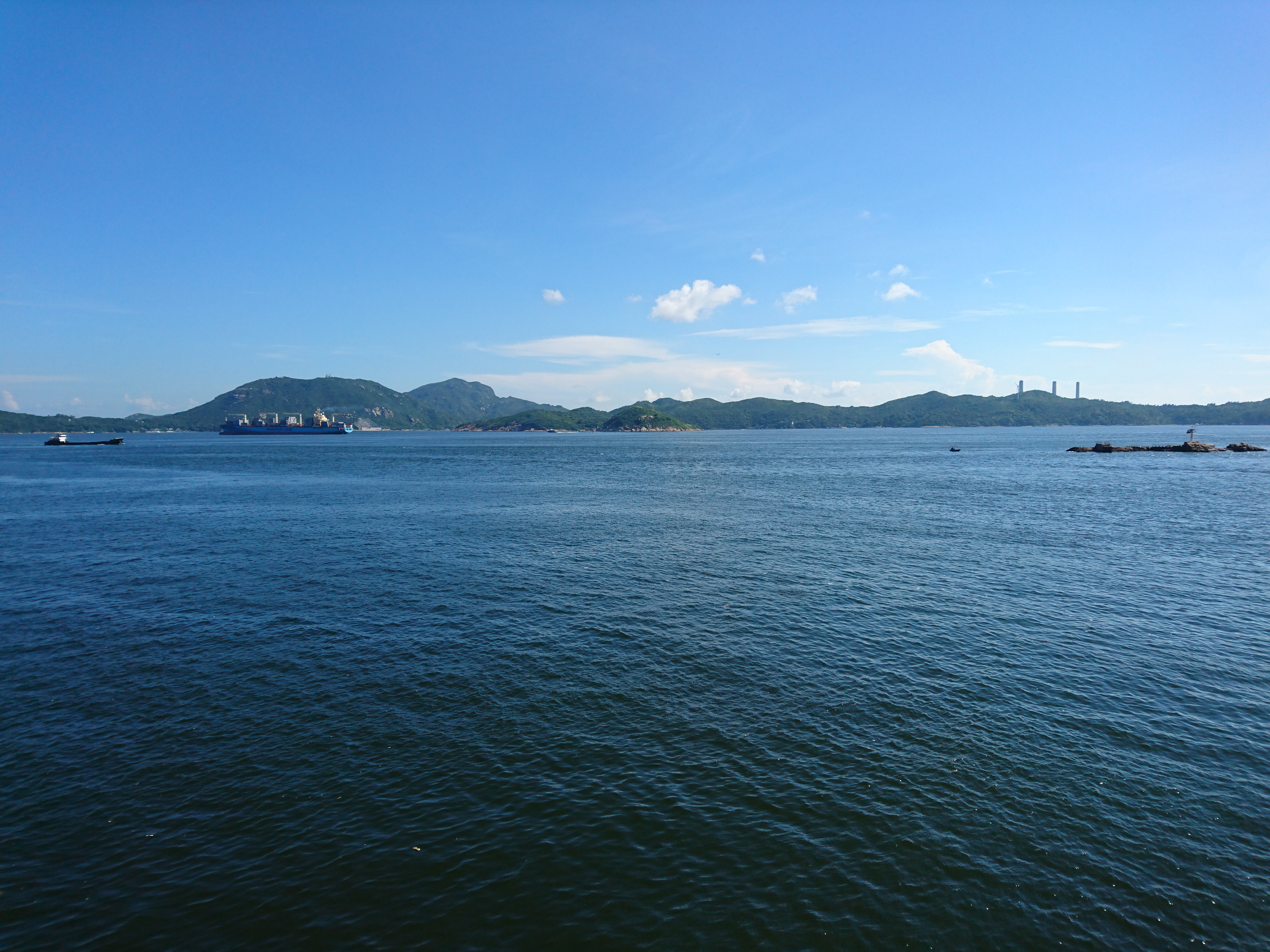
- East Lamma Channel near Lung Shan Pai
- Interactive map of East Lamma Channel
- Location: Hong Kong
- Coordinates: 22.231°N 114.144°E
- Type: Channel

East Lamma Channel
- Traditional Chinese: 東博寮海峽
Transcriptions
Yue: Cantonese
- Yale Romanization: Dūng bok lìuh hói haahp
- Jyutping: Dung1 bok3 liu4 hoi2 haap6

The East Lamma Channel (Chinese: 東博寮海峽) is a sea channel in Hong Kong. It lies between the western shores of Hong Kong Island and Ap Lei Chau, and the east side of Lamma Island. To the north it leads into the Sulphur Channel and Victoria Harbour, to the south into the South China Sea.

== Extent ==
The plying limits of the East Lamma Channel were defined in the Merchant Shipping (Launches and Ferry Vessels) Regulations of Hong Kong in 1964 as follows:

"The waters ... to seaward of Ap Lei Chau, to seaward of the ... plying limits of Aberdeen Harbour and Aberdeen Channel and the southern coast of Hong Kong Island, and to seaward of the south-western limit of the Victoria Harbour ... plying area, bounded by a straight line drawn from the south-western extremity of Green Island to the Northern extremity of Lamma Island, thence by the eastern shore of Lamma Island to its eastern extremity, thence by a straight line across to the southern extremity of Hong Kong Island."

== Navigation ==
The East Lamma Channel is one of the areas in the world with the heaviest traffic with more than 150 deep-water vessels of all kinds passing there every day. The eastern entrance to the channel is also the pilot point for ships going to the Kwai Tsing Container Terminals and for ships passing the Ma Wan water way up to the eastern Pearl River Delta ports in Shenzhen and Guangzhou. The East Lamma Channel is the deepest water entrance to the Hong Kong water area and part of the traffic controlled Ma Wan water way used by nearly all bigger ships coming from the east.

By Hong Kong maritime laws, ocean-going vessels entering Hong Kong via the East Lamma Straight need to slow down in order to pick up pilots at the Nganchau Pilot Boarding Station, then enter the west channel to the western seaports. When ocean-going vessels leave ports in Hong Kong, they also need to slow down and let the pilot disembark at the Nganchau Pilot Boarding Station. Therefore, the average speed of ships sailing in this strait is usually not higher than 15 knots.

== See also ==
- West Lamma Channel
