= Waglan Island =

橫瀾島
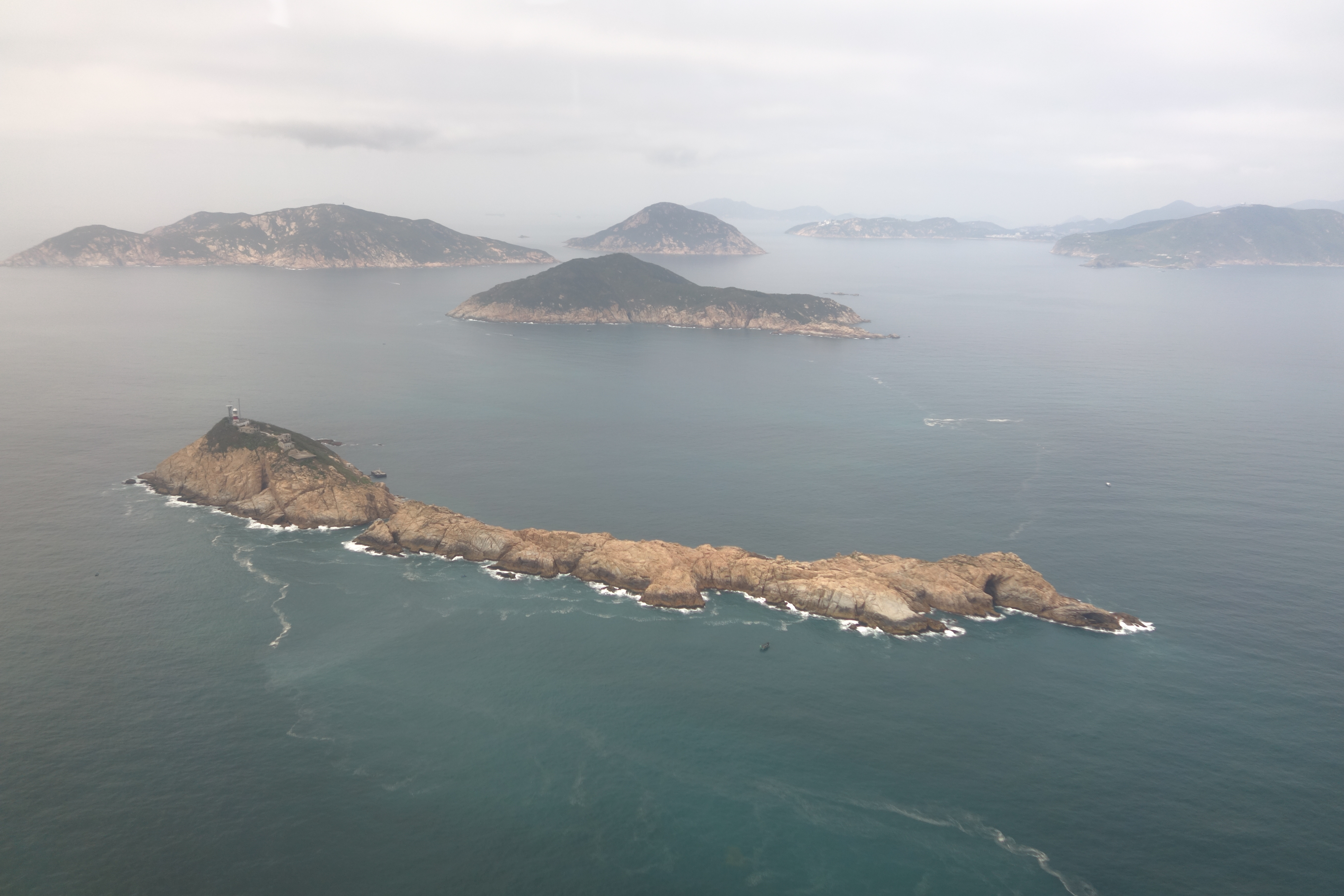
- Waglan Island and the Po Toi group of islands

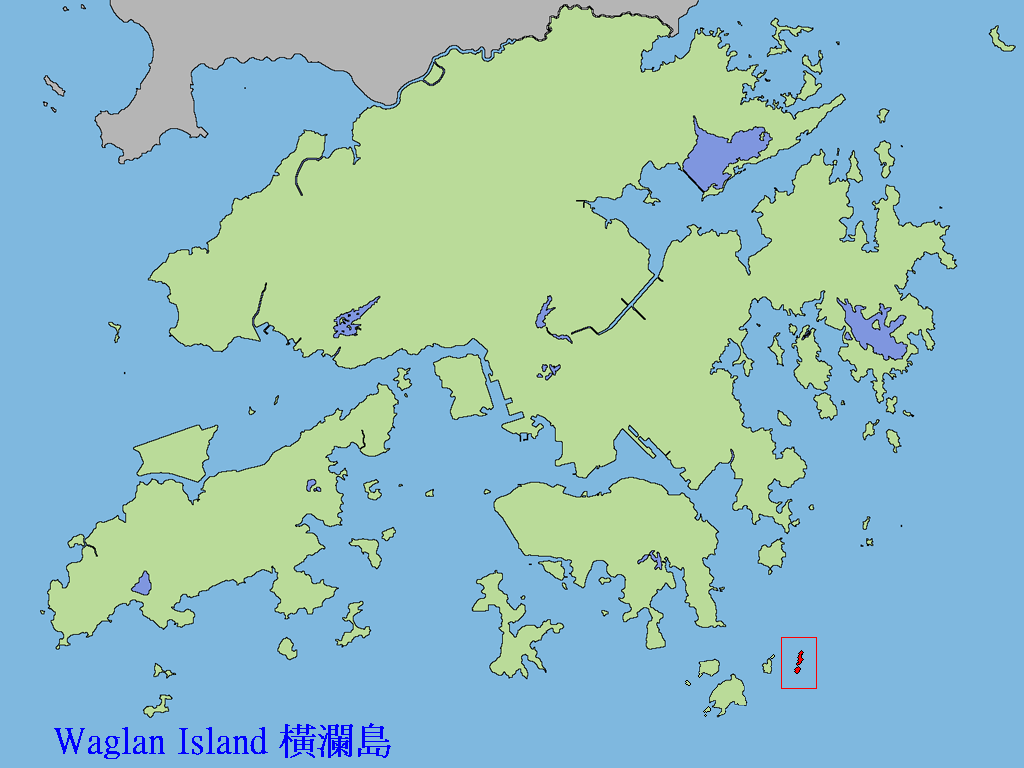
- Location of Waglan Island within Hong Kong

Geography
- Location: South China Sea
- Area: 0.104 km^{2} (0.040 sq mi)

Administration
- Hong Kong
- District: Islands District

Demographics
- Population: 0

Waglan Island
- Traditional Chinese: 橫瀾島
- Simplified Chinese: 横澜岛
Transcriptions
Standard Mandarin
- Hanyu Pinyin: Hénglándǎo
Yue: Cantonese
- Yale Romanization: Wàahng làahn dóu
- Jyutping: Waang^{4} laan^{4} dou^{2}

Waglan Island (Chinese: 橫瀾島; Jyutping: waang4 laan4 dou2) is a member of the Po Toi group of islands in Hong Kong. Waglan Lighthouse, a declared monument dating to 1893 stands there. Since 1989 Waglan lighthouse is automated and Waglan Island is uninhabited. The island also hosts a ground of meteorological observation and recording for the Hong Kong Observatory.

== Climate ==
Climate data for Waglan Island (1991–2020)
Month	Jan	Feb	Mar	Apr	May	Jun	Jul	Aug	Sep	Oct	Nov	Dec	Year
Record high °C (°F)	28.5 (83.3)	28.8 (83.8)	32.3 (90.1)	33.4 (92.1)	37.9 (100.2)	38.4 (101.1)	37.7 (99.9)	38.1 (100.6)	36.9 (98.4)	35.1 (95.2)	33.1 (91.6)	29.9 (85.8)	38.4 (101.1)
Mean daily maximum °C (°F)	18.5 (65.3)	18.8 (65.8)	20.9 (69.6)	24.9 (76.8)	28.5 (83.3)	30.6 (87.1)	31.4 (88.5)	31.4 (88.5)	30.9 (87.6)	28.4 (83.1)	24.6 (76.3)	20.4 (68.7)	25.8 (78.4)
Daily mean °C (°F)	15.7 (60.3)	16.2 (61.2)	18.3 (64.9)	22.0 (71.6)	25.5 (77.9)	27.8 (82.0)	28.3 (82.9)	28.1 (82.6)	27.6 (81.7)	25.3 (77.5)	21.8 (71.2)	17.7 (63.9)	22.9 (73.1)
Mean daily minimum °C (°F)	14.0 (57.2)	14.5 (58.1)	16.6 (61.9)	20.2 (68.4)	23.7 (74.7)	25.7 (78.3)	26.1 (79.0)	25.9 (78.6)	25.5 (77.9)	23.6 (74.5)	20 (68)	15.8 (60.4)	21.0 (69.8)
Record low °C (°F)	3.4 (38.1)	6.0 (42.8)	7.8 (46.0)	10.2 (50.4)	17.4 (63.3)	20.2 (68.4)	21.5 (70.7)	21.7 (71.1)	18.7 (65.7)	16.1 (61.0)	9.8 (49.6)	4.4 (39.9)	3.4 (38.1)
Average precipitation mm (inches)	23.8 (0.94)	26.2 (1.03)	45.8 (1.80)	102.0 (4.02)	167.7 (6.60)	215.4 (8.48)	184.6 (7.27)	207.3 (8.16)	173.4 (6.83)	47.3 (1.86)	26.2 (1.03)	16.0 (0.63)	1,235.7 (48.65)
Average relative humidity (%)	76.4	82.0	85.0	86.9	86.9	86.1	85.7	86.8	81.0	74.4	74.8	72.0	81.5
Source: Hong Kong Observatory

== History ==
=== Pre-1900 ===
Before the 1840s, there was not much sea traffic in Hong Kong. But after the Treaties of Nanking, Peking and Tientsin from 1842 to 1860, the Qing government was forced to open more trading ports. Hong Kong was one such port that became strategic for merchants arriving from Europe, hence lighthouses were needed to guide ships safely to port.

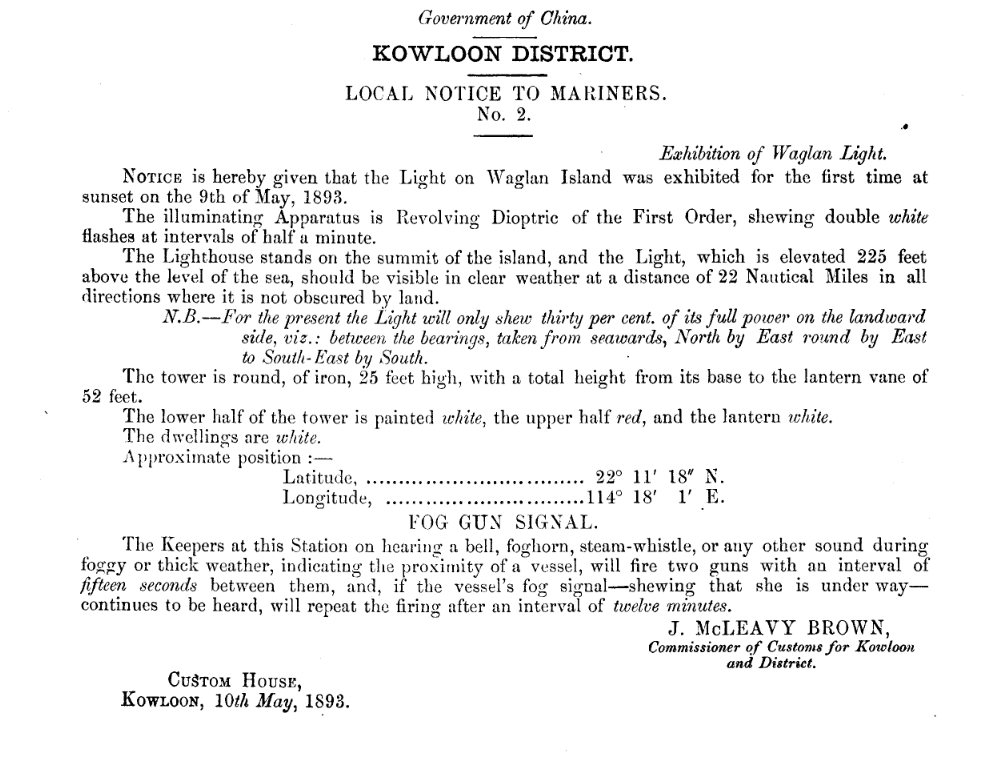
Notice to Mariners in 1893 about the inauguration of the Waglan Lighthouse.

Waglan Lighthouse entered service on 9 May 1893, the layout of Waglan Island Lighthouse was designed by David Marr Henderson, Engineer in Chief of the Chinese Maritime Customs. The original plan included the lighthouse, living quarters, a fresh water collection tank, and a derrick used to transport people and cargo onto the island. It was managed by the Chinese Maritime Customs from Shanghai.

Plan of Wagland Island Lighthouse on 3 March 1894, drawn by David Marr Henderson.

Before Waglan Lighthouse entered service in 1893, Waglan Island was an uninhabited island. After the lighthouse's operation there have been a number of keepers who lived in Waglan Island. The working team who managed the lighthouse consisted of one principal Lighthouse Keeper, two lighthouse keepers, five attendants (who did chores such as grass cutting and cleaning), and one cook. The team would spend one month on Waglan which was followed by one week's leave. Initially, German keepers were used.

=== 1900 - World War II ===
On 1 March 1901, Waglan island was transferred to the British after the Lease of New Territories and outlying islands in 1898. The Hong Kong British Government paid $2,943.60 to the Qing government for the furniture and maintenance of the lighthouse. Employing 3 Europeans and assisted by 6 Chinese as the working team. In the coming years, a saluting battery featuring three 18-pounder cannons was installed for fog signals and defense.

In 1923 a twin type Diaphone was installed as a replacement to the cannons' fog signal. It produced a two tone blast, an upper tone followed by a full steady low tone of equal or greater duration than the first tone. The Diaphone was powered a with diesel engine and compressor, and could be heard 5 miles away in the worst fog.

=== World War II ===
In Dec 1941, in preparation of World War II, the original lens and lamp lens, along with the communication equipment were destroyed by the British Navy. On 13 Dec 10:30 am the keeper and staff were evacuated and taken to Aberdeen. Subsequently, after the Japanese invasion of Hong Kong, Japanese troops were stationed on the island. Waglan Island Lighthouse was extensively damaged by the Japanese and the aerial bombings by Allied aircraft during World War II.

=== Post-war ===
In 1945 after World War II the lighthouse resumed operations, installing a temporary light for the purpose. In January 1946, the Hong Kong Civil Affairs Committee approved HK$2,050,000 for the reconstruction and modernization of Waglan Lighthouse and its facilities.

As a result of the funding, in 1950 a new light was put into service. Dubbed "World's most modern lighthouse" by SCMP, it was assembled from parts totaling 25 tonnes, ordered from two British companies and the AGA firm in Sweden. from 1950 to 1960 Many facilities were also improved or built in the lighthouse compound. Including: a new building to house 25-ton generator and machines (1950); Wireless Communication equipment (1950s); three new water tanks (1953); The Royal Observatory, Cable & Wireless Ltd. buildings, Radio and Weather Station (1952); a new fog horn system on top of the engine room (1955). Damaged air raid shelter tunnels were also back-filled.

== Waglan lighthouse ==
Waglan Island Lighthouse Wang Lan To
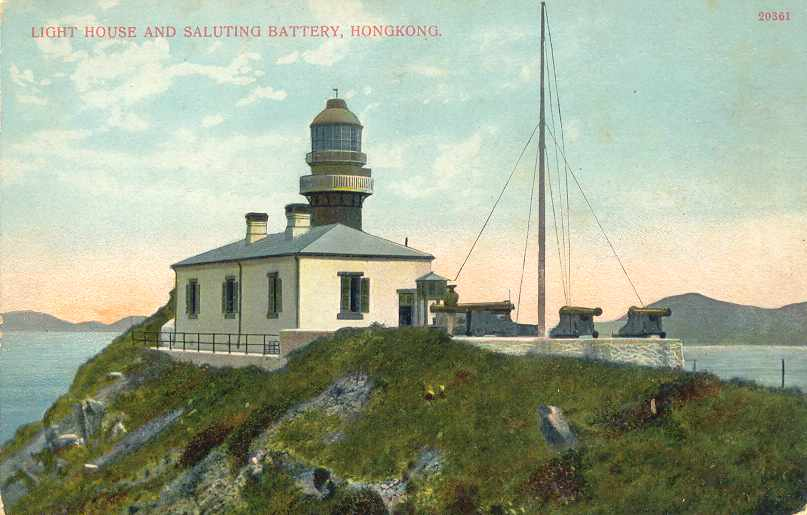
- Waglan lighthouse in the 1910s
- Location: Waglan Island, Hong Kong
- Coordinates: 22.181991°N 114.302880°E

Tower
- Constructed: 1893
- Construction: cast iron tower
- Automated: 1989
- Height: 16 metres (52 ft)
- Shape: cylindrical tower with balcony and lantern
- Markings: white tower with a horizontal red band under the balcony, white lantern
- Heritage: declared monuments of Hong Kong
- Fog signal: two blasts every 60s.

Light
- Focal height: 69 metres (226 ft)
- Range: 24 nautical miles (44 km; 28 mi)
- Characteristic: Fl (2) W 20s.
- Hong Kong no.: HK-102

The Waglan Lighthouse on Waglan Island has been listed as a declared monument of Hong Kong since 2000. It commenced operation in 1893; it is one of the five surviving pre-war lighthouses in Hong Kong.

The lighthouse itself was built by Paris lighthouse makers Barbier, Bénard & Turenne as one of two identical lights for the Chinese Maritime Customs Marine Department (the other was Beiyushan Lighthouse). Both were some of the first lighthouses in the world to use a new mercury bath rotating lens design that allowed an 8 tonne first order lens to be rotated with the push of a finger. They were constructed of cast iron, disassembled and shipped out for reassembly in their chosen locations.

During the 1930s, two Chinese became second class lighthouse keepers: Wong Kai Chung from 1930 and Leung Chiu Tung from 1933. Both of them have been stationed at Gap Rock lighthouse as apprentices before being promoted and transferred to Waglan Lighthouse.

== Gallery ==
Lighthouse of Waglan Island.

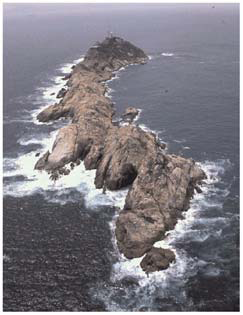
Waglan Island as seen from the north.

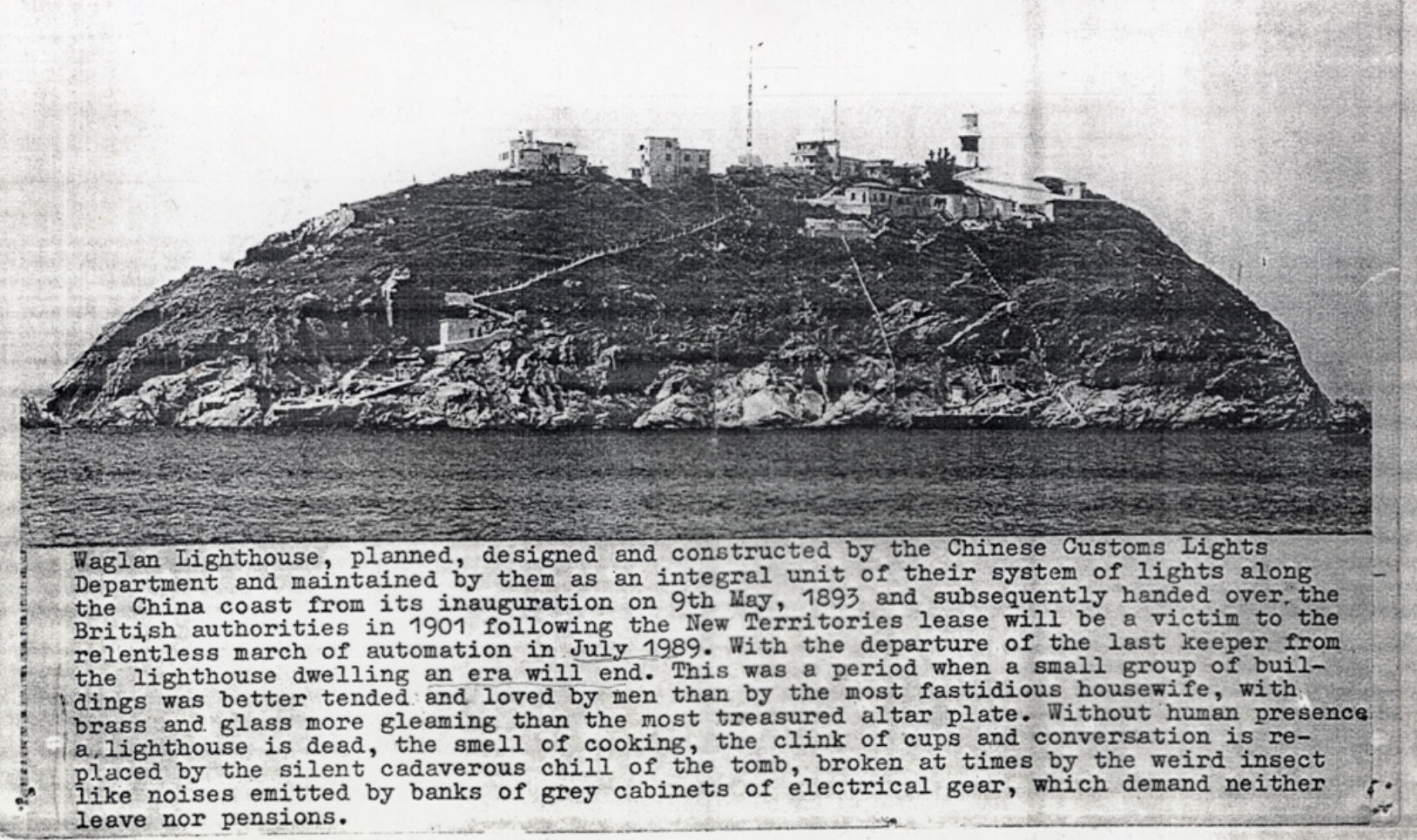
Waglan Island and Waglan Lighthouse compound.

== See also ==
- Hong Kong Observatory
- Green Island Lighthouse Compound
- Cape D'Aguilar Lighthouse
- Tang Lung Chau Lighthouse
- List of lighthouses in China
- SS Hsin Wah
