= Green Island, Hong Kong =

Island with a lighthouse

Green Island Lighthouse
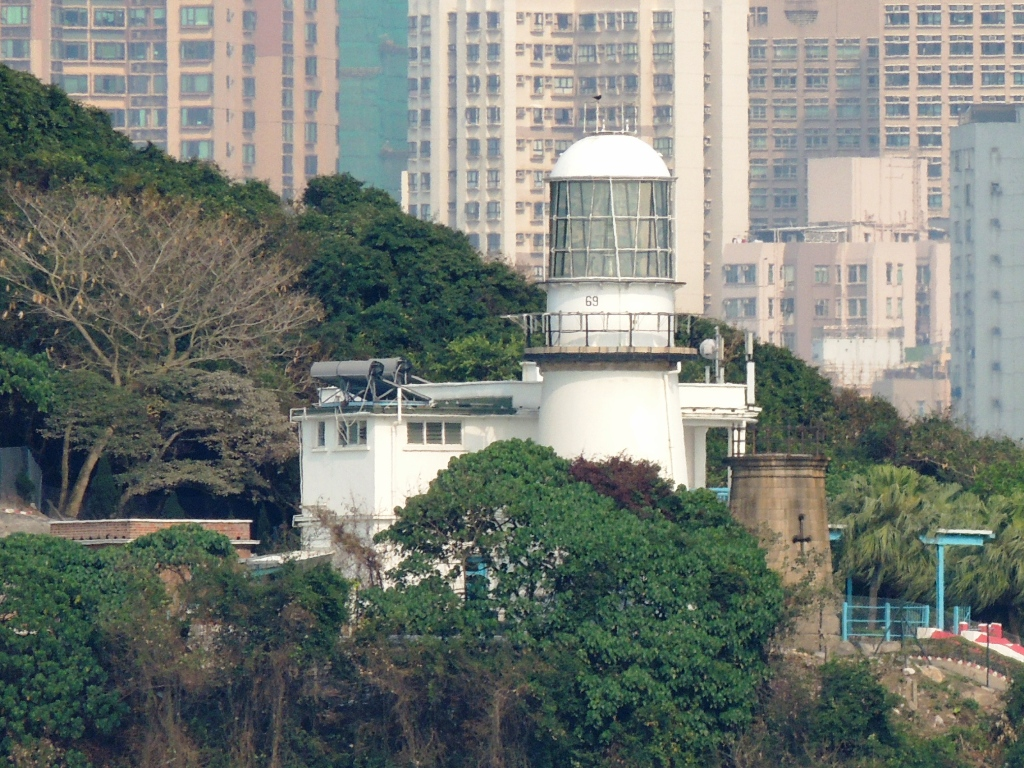
- Green Island Lighthouse in 2013.
- Location: Green Island, Green Island, Central and Western District, Hong Kong, People's Republic of China
- Coordinates: 22°17′01″N 114°06′41″E

Tower
- Constructed: 1875 (first)
- Construction: granite tower (both)
- Height: 12 metres (39 ft) (first); 17.5 metres (57 ft) (current)
- Shape: cylindrical tower with balcony and lantern (current) cylindrical tower and lantern removed (first)
- Markings: white tower and lantern
- Heritage: declared monuments of Hong Kong

Light
- First lit: 1905 (current)
- Focal height: 37 metres (121 ft) (current)
- Lens: 4th order Fresnel lens (first), 1st order Fresnel lens (current)
- Range: 16 nmi (30 km; 18 mi)
- Characteristic: Fl W 10s
- Hong Kong no.: HK-069

Chinese name
- Chinese: 青洲
Transcriptions
Standard Mandarin
- Hanyu Pinyin: Qīngzhōu
Hakka
- Romanization: Ciang^{5} ziu^{1}
Yue: Cantonese
- Yale Romanization: Chīng jāu
- Jyutping: Cing^{1} zau^{1}

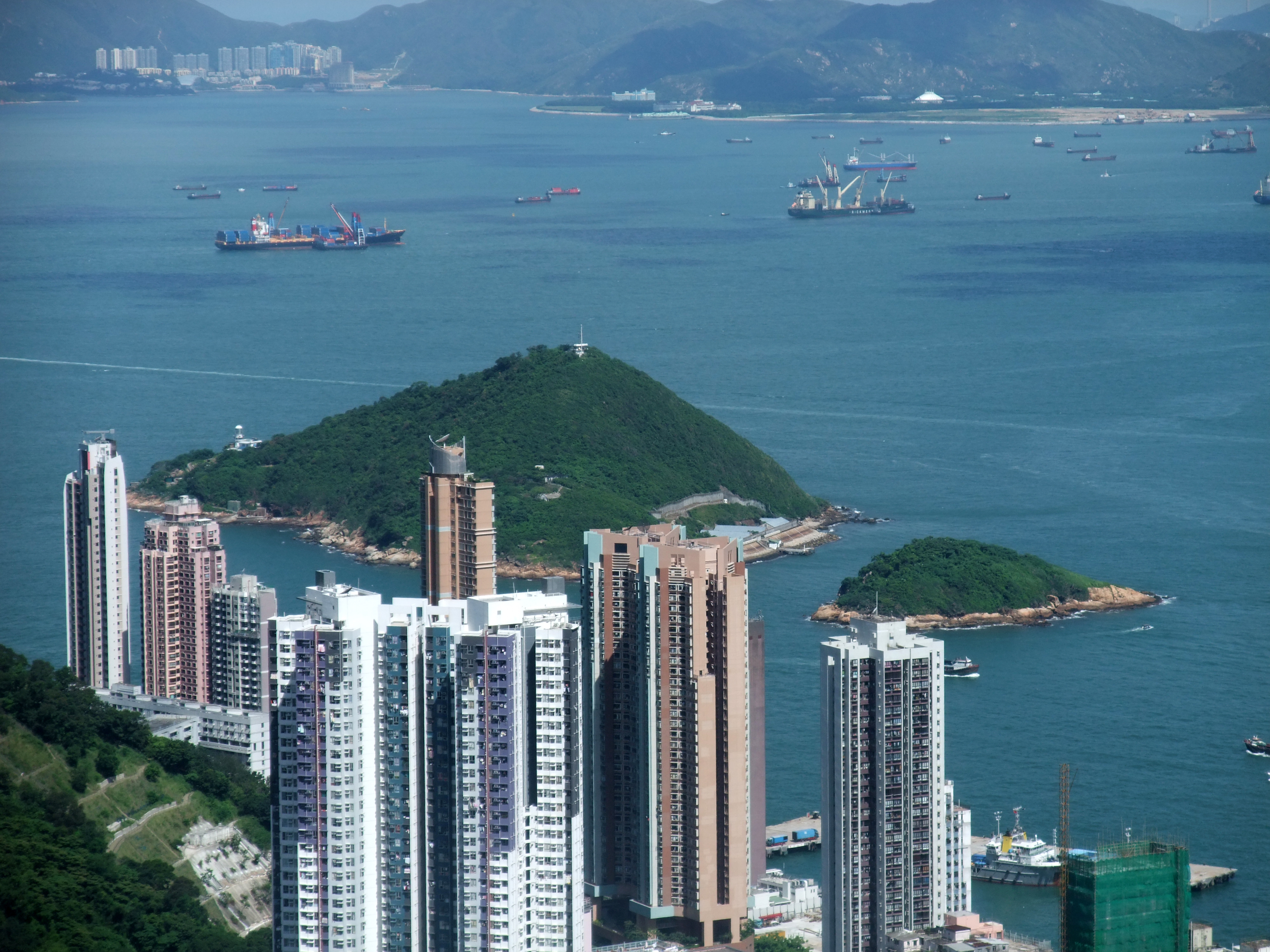
Green Island and Little Green Island viewed from Hong Kong Island.

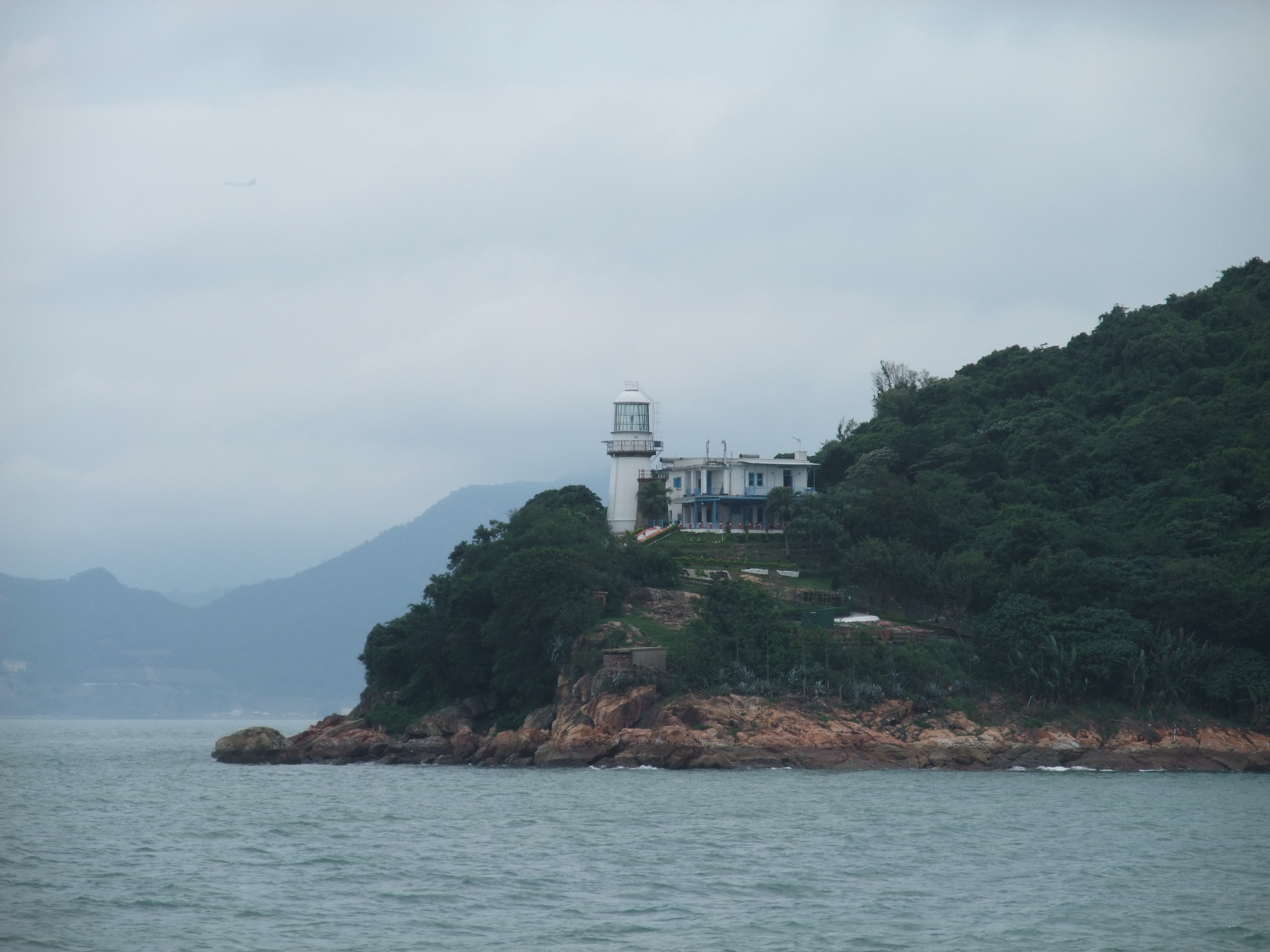
Green Island and its lighthouse.

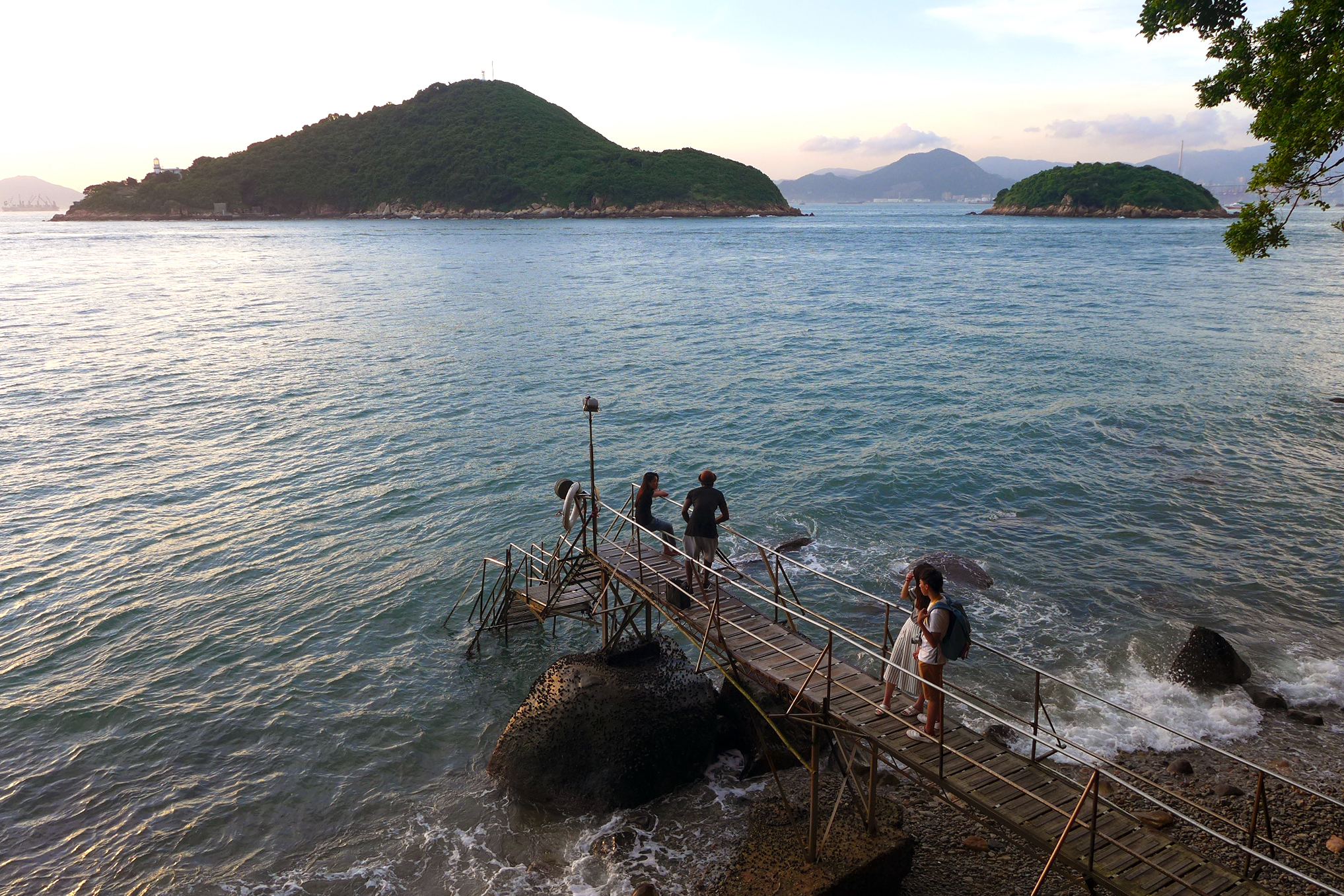
Green Island and Little Green Island viewed across Sulphur Channel. The Sai Wan Swimming Shed is visible in the foreground.

Green Island (Chinese: 青洲) is an island off the northwest coast of Kennedy Town, Hong Kong Island, separated by the Sulphur Channel. A smaller island nearby to the east, uninhabited, is called Little Green Island (小青洲). Administratively, the two islands are part of Central and Western District.

Green Island is largely uninhabited and at the east coast are Green Island Reception Centre and Green Island Police Station. On the top of the hill is an office of the Marine Department and a lighthouse southwest guides the ships in Sulphur Channel.

== Buildings ==
=== Lighthouse compound ===
The buildings of the Green Island Lighthouse Compound were declared as monuments in 2008. The historic buildings include the two lighthouses built in 1875 and 1905, former European quarters and a former keeper's house. The two lighthouses and the European quarters were previously individually listed as Grade II historic buildings.

The first lighthouse, 12 metres (39 ft) tall and constructed of granite, began operation on 1 July 1875. There are two cross-shaped openings on its wall for ventilation and lighting. The openings resemble gun-posts like those found in medieval European castles. These are of the same construction as those found on the Cape Collinson Lighthouse at Siu Sai Wan, Hong Kong Island. It was later disused in 1905 because the building was too small to carry the lens from the Cape D'Aguilar Lighthouse.

Construction began on a second lighthouse in 1904, completed in 1905, which was originally intended to house the Cape D’Aguilar light. Built of granite and concrete, sitting beside its predecessor, the newer lighthouse is 17.5 metres (57 ft) tall, painted white, with a steel-caged lantern on top. A concrete spiral staircase with rails gives access to the lantern room. An upper floor was added to the keeper's house in 1923 and the lighthouse was automated in the 1970s. The two lighthouses, along with Cape D'Aguilar Lighthouse, Waglan Island Lighthouse and Tang Lung Chau Lighthouse (Kap Sing Lighthouse) are the only prewar lighthouses remaining.

=== Living quarters and house ===
The keeper's house has a flat roof and is designed in an 'L' shape. The house has arched windows and hanging eaves.

The quarters was converted to the Police Recreation Centre for an unknown time. They were also leased to the Wu Oi Christian Centre as a youth drug treatment rehabilitation centre.

=== Green Island Reception Centre ===
The Green Island Reception Centre (青洲羈押中心) was historically used as a temporary reception centre for Vietnamese refugees. As of 1997, it was used to accommodate Vietnamese illegal immigrants (VIIs) temporarily for quarantine purposes. The Centre was then managed by the CSD.

== Flora and fauna ==
The island is densely covered with woodland and tall scrub. A total of 150 plant species and a large variety of butterfly species has been found. One ant species not previously found elsewhere in Hong Kong was recorded on Green Island. The locally rare reef egret and white-bellied sea eagle have been seen on the island.

== Air traffic ==
Green Island is an important reporting point for location aviation in Hong Kong for entry to Victoria Harbour by air. All local traffic flying into or out of the harbour must report overhead Green Island. As the harbour is quite narrow and aviation traffic can be heavy at times due to the large number of helicopters and light aircraft, Green Island can also act as a holding point before permission to enter is granted by air traffic control.

== Weather station ==
In 1989, an automatic weather station was built on Green Island by the Hong Kong Observatory. It is the first weather station in Victoria Harbour to be powered by both solar and wind energy. The station is provides warning of tropical cyclone and monsoon to ships traveling in and out of the harbour.

== Shelved reclamation plan ==
In the 1990s, the Hong Kong Government proposed reclaiming approximately 181 hectares (450 acres) of land from Sulphur Channel to provide accommodation for a population of 103,465 and more road infrastructure. This included a coastal highway from Kennedy Town to Aberdeen (then called Route 7) and a fourth cross-harbour tunnel to a proposed container port at North Lantau. This proposal was shelved due to strong opposition from environmental concern groups.

== See also ==
- List of lighthouses in Hong Kong
- Waglan Lighthouse
- Cape D'Aguilar Lighthouse
- Tang Lung Chau Lighthouse
