= Zhongjiang Pagoda =

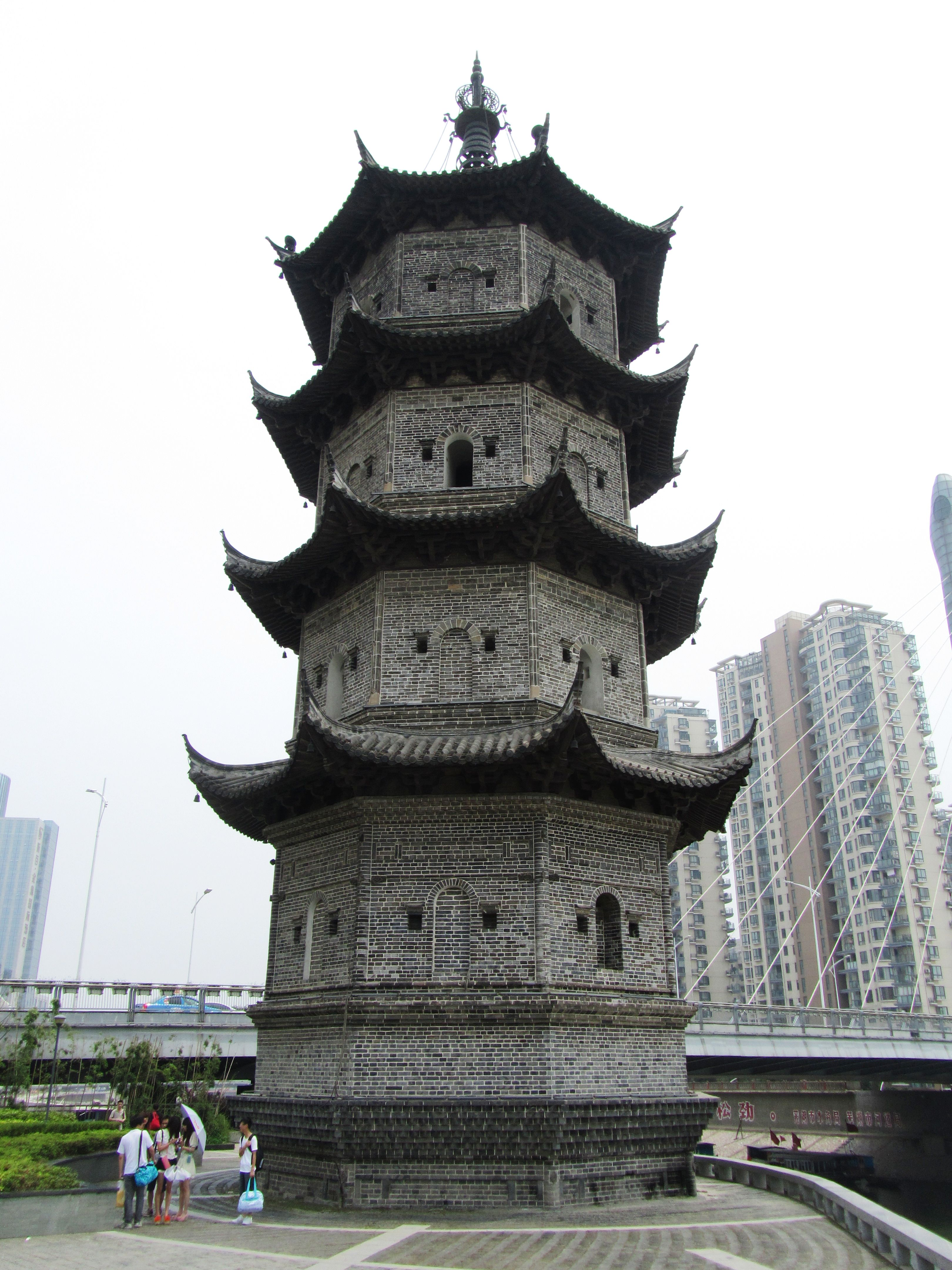
- Zhongjiang Pagoda (Lighthouse)
- Location: Wuhu, China
- Coordinates: 31°19′32″N 118°21′47″E

Tower
- Construction: concrete and wood
- Height: 35 metres (115 ft)
- Shape: octagonal tower with flying eaves
- Markings: None

Zhongjiang Pagoda (中江塔 or Jiang Tower) is a 35-metre (115 ft) five level or story Pagoda, situated between the Qingyi and Yangtze (Changjiang) Rivers in Wuhu City, Anhui Province, China.

== History ==
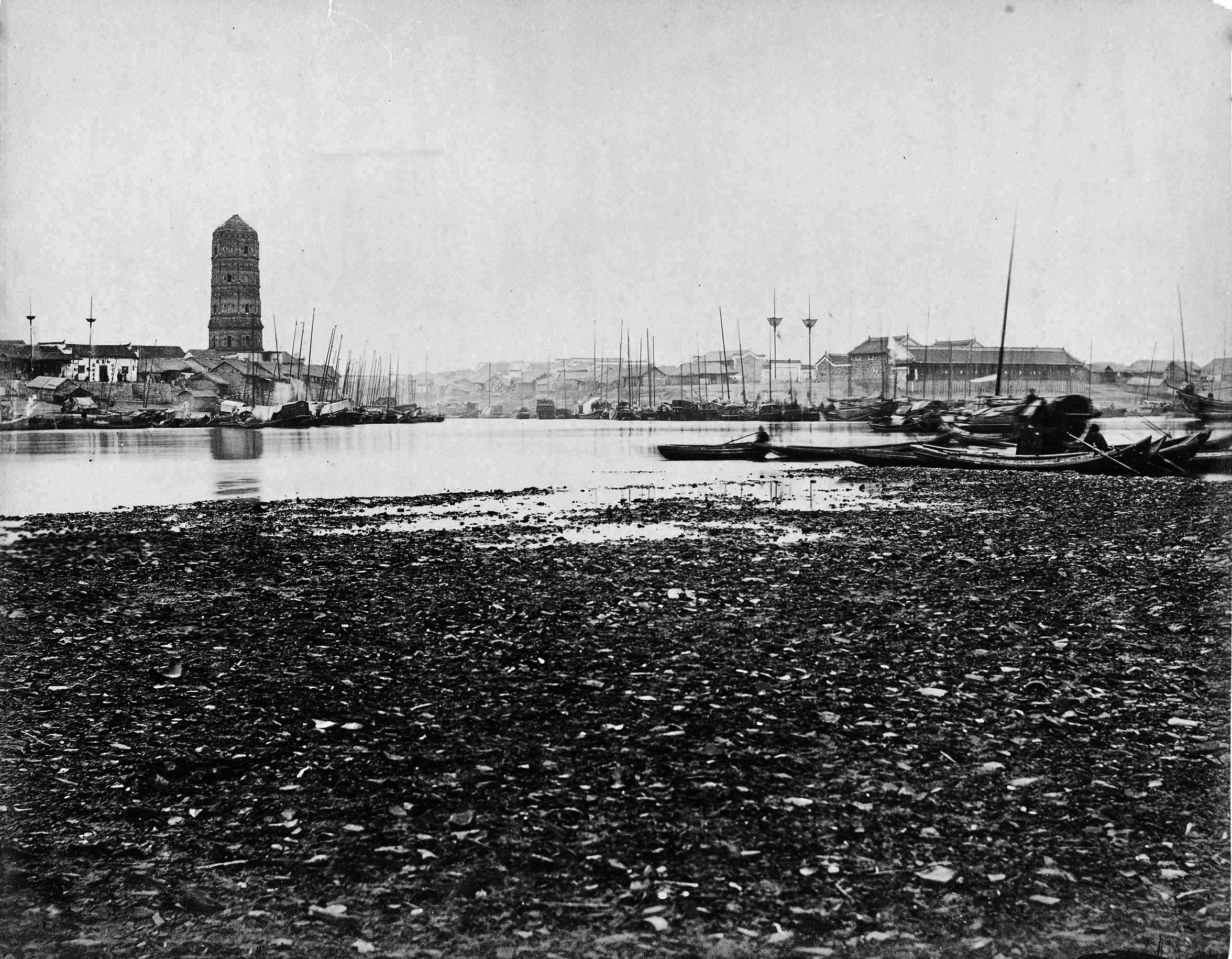
Zhongjiang Pagoda in the late 19th century.

The Zhongjiang Pagoda was constructed in 1618, during the Ming Dynasty, and rebuilt in 1669 during the Qing dynasty, was a navigation aid for boats and ships later known as a lighthouse, and is maintained by the Maritime Safety Administration.

The Pagoda was repaired in 1669 during the Qing Dynasty, rebuilt in 1988, and is a key preservation unit of historical and cultural relics in Wuhu. The top of the Pagoda fell off during the 2008 Sichuan earthquake.

== Construction ==
The Zhongjiang Pagoda is octagonal in shape, constructed of concrete and wood. The second, third, and fourth floors, as well as the roof, are constructed with "flying eaves".

== See also ==
- List of lighthouses in China
