= SS Hsin Wah =

History

Hong Kong
- Name: Hsin Wah
- Owner: China Merchants Steam Navigation Company
- Builder: Napier & Miller
- Yard number: 235
- Launched: 8 June 1921
- Completed: 1921
- Fate: Sank 1929
- Notes: 401 fatalities, 20 rescued

General characteristics
- Type: Steamship
- Tonnage: 1940 grt
- Length: 82.3 meters
- Height: 6.4 meters
- Depth: 12.2 meters
- Installed power: 162 nhp
- Propulsion: triple expansion engine
- Speed: 10 knots
- Capacity: 329 passengers
- Crew: 100
- Notes: UKHO Wreck number 46569

SS Hsin Wah
- Traditional Chinese: 新華輪
- Simplified Chinese: 新华轮
- Postal: SS Hsin Wah
- Literal meaning: New China ship
Transcriptions
Standard Mandarin
- Hanyu Pinyin: Xīnhuá Lún
- Wade–Giles: Hsin-wa Chien

SS Hsin Wah, now also known as the SS Xinhua, was a steamship owned by China Merchants Steam Navigation Company, navigating between Canton City, Hong Kong, and Shanghai. She was built in 1921 by Napier & Miller in Glasgow. The ship was seized by pirates of Bias Bay in 1928 and saved by the SS Zhongshan (then written Chung Shan). She sank in 1929 when grounded on northern rocks of Waglan Island south-east of Hong Kong Island, with a loss of between 300 and 400 lives.

== Construction and commissioning ==
Hsin Wah was built in 1921 by Napier & Miller of Glasgow under commission by the China Merchants Steam Navigation Company. She had a triple expansion engine capable of a top speed of around 10 knots.

== Sinking ==
Hsin Wah was on approach to Hong Kong after journeying from Shanghai under the command of Captain N. R. Jensen, a Dane, when she struck rocks in the early morning of 16 January 1929 off Waglan Island. Jensen thereafter managed to free the vessel by moving the ship astern, however Hsin Wah began to take on water and list developed. In the chaos, only one lifeboat was able to successfully launch from the ship but the lifeboat capsized in due to the weather almost immediately. The ship sank as a result around an hour after the initial crash. Of the ship's complement, only around 20 people were able to be saved by Chinese fishermen in the area with the survivors recounting the horrific scramble to escape the foundering vessel.

Hsin Wah lies at a depth of 23 meters below the waters off northern Waglan Island at 22.19 Latitude, 114.3 Longitude where the wreckage remains visible as of the Hong Kong Marine Department survey of 15 October 2008.
