= Tang Lung Chau =

Islet of Hong Kong

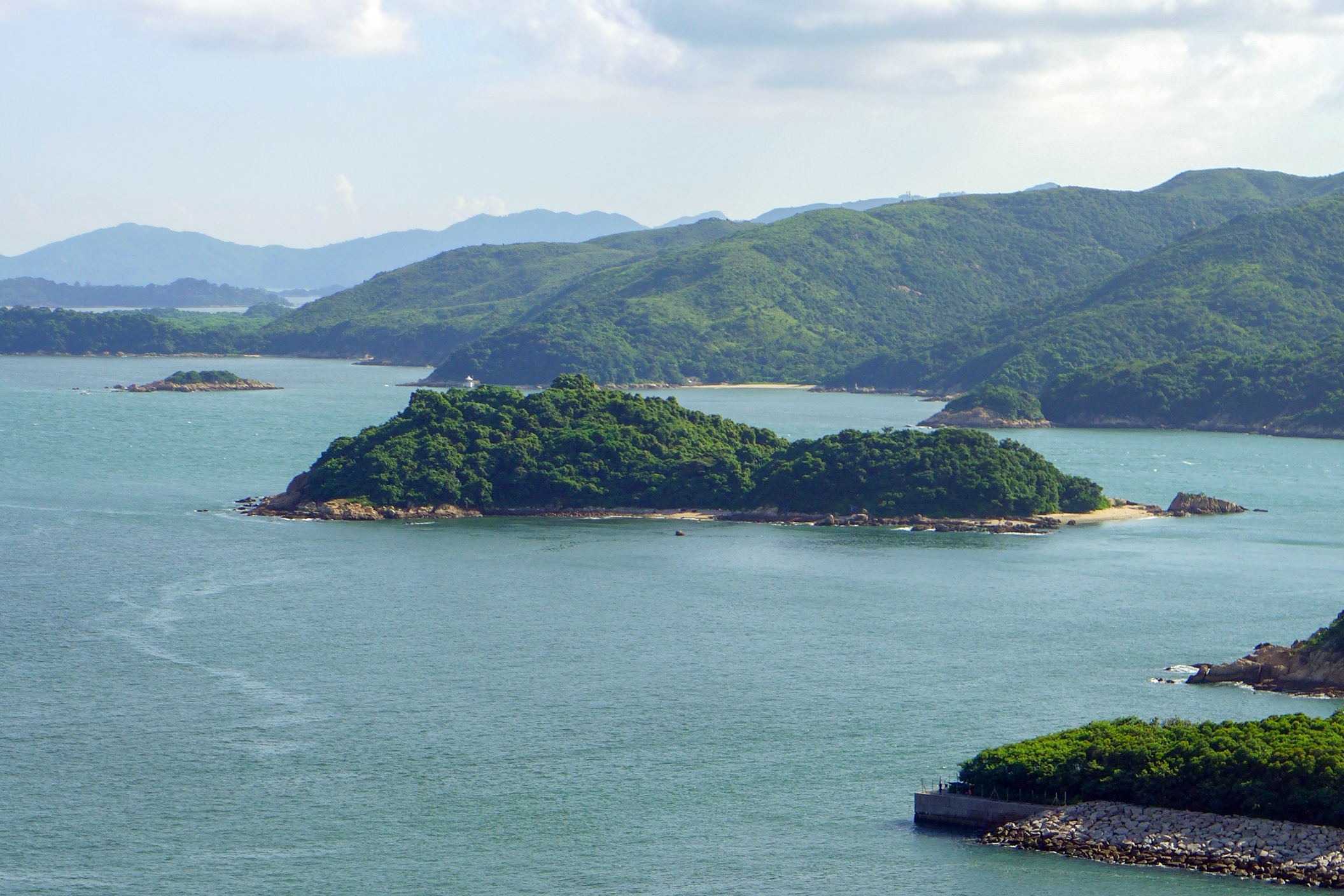
- View of Tang Lung Chau from Tsing Ma Bridge.
- Traditional Chinese: 燈籠洲
- Simplified Chinese: 灯笼洲
Transcriptions
Standard Mandarin
- Hanyu Pinyin: Dēnglóngzhōu
Hakka
- Romanization: Den1 lung2 ziu1
Yue: Cantonese
- Yale Romanization: Dāng lùhng jāu
- Jyutping: Dang1 lung4 zau1
- Sidney Lau: Dang^{1} Lung^{4} Jau^{1}

Tang Lung Chau (Chinese: 燈籠洲) is an islet located off the southern coast of Ma Wan island to the northwest of Hong Kong Island, Hong Kong. It is located within Tsuen Wan District of the New Territories.

== Lighthouse ==
Tang Lung Chau Lighthouse
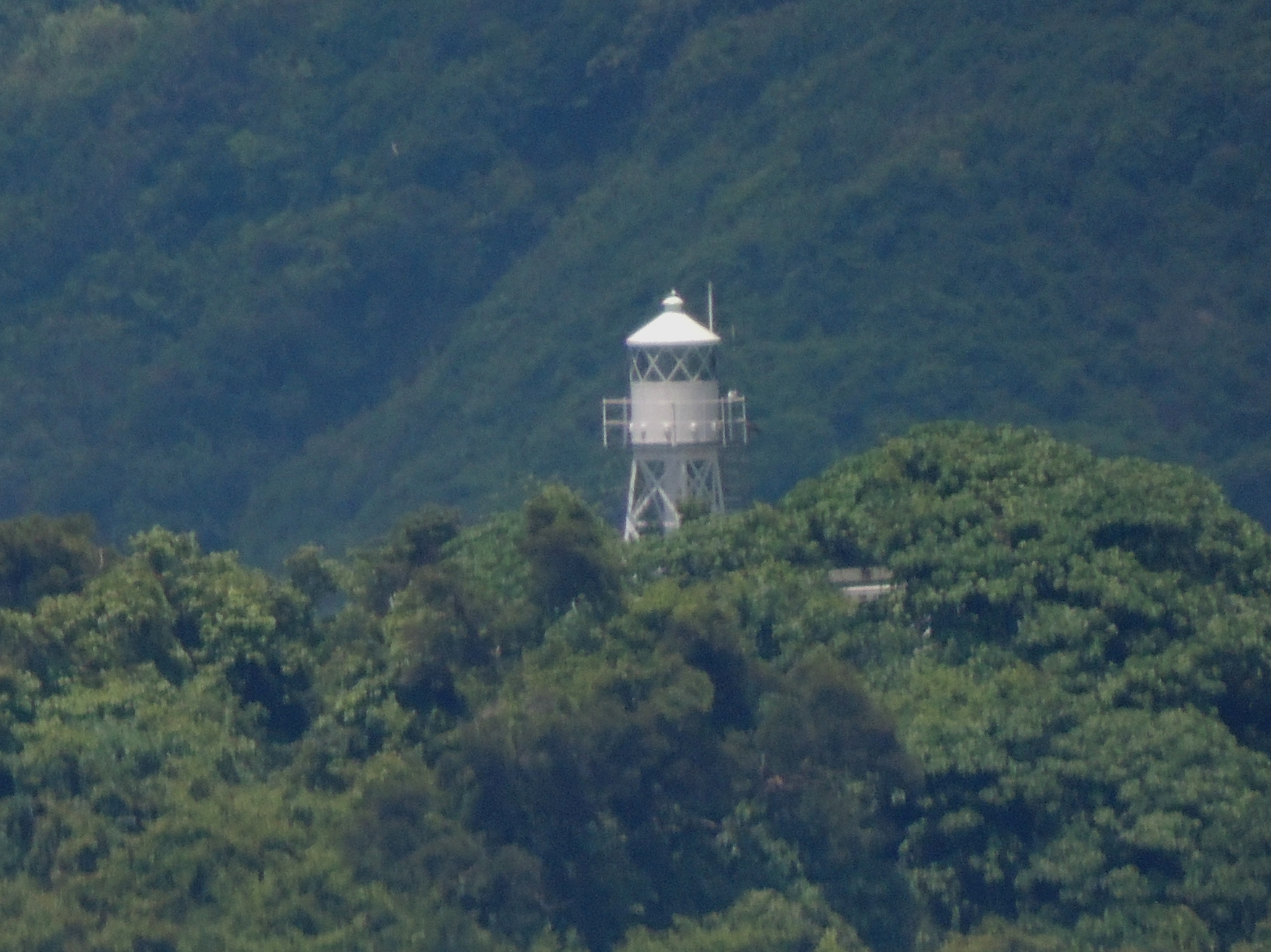
- Location: Tang Lung Chau, Tsuen Wan District, Hong Kong, People's Republic of China
- Coordinates: 22°20′23″N 114°03′47″E

Tower
- Constructed: 1912
- Foundation: concrete base
- Construction: metal skeletal tower
- Height: 12 m (39 ft)
- Shape: square pyramidal skeletal tower with balcony and lantern
- Markings: white tower and lantern
- Heritage: declared monuments of Hong Kong

Light
- Focal height: 37 m (121 ft)
- Range: 18 nmi (33 km; 21 mi)
- Characteristic: Fl W 5s
- Hong Kong no.: HK-062

Tang Lung Chau Lighthouse and the former lightkeeper's house, located on Tang Lung Chau, was declared a monument on 29 December 2000.

The lighthouse, also commonly known as Kap Sing Lighthouse, was put into service on 29 April 1912; it is one of the five surviving pre-war lighthouses in Hong Kong. It is a skeletal steel tower of 11.8 metres (39 ft) high with a white lantern on top. The steel tower and light apparatus were obtained from England. The lighthouse, unmanned and automated, is now under the management of the Marine Department.

There is a bedroom, a kitchen, a latrine and a store room in the adjoining brick light keeper's house. There was no spring or fresh water supply on the island so the light keeper of Tang Lung Chau Lighthouse used rainwater which was collected from the roof and then diverted into an underground tank.

== See also ==
- List of lighthouses in Hong Kong
- Green Island Lighthouse Compound
- Cape D'Aguilar Lighthouse
- Waglan Lighthouse

== Gallery ==
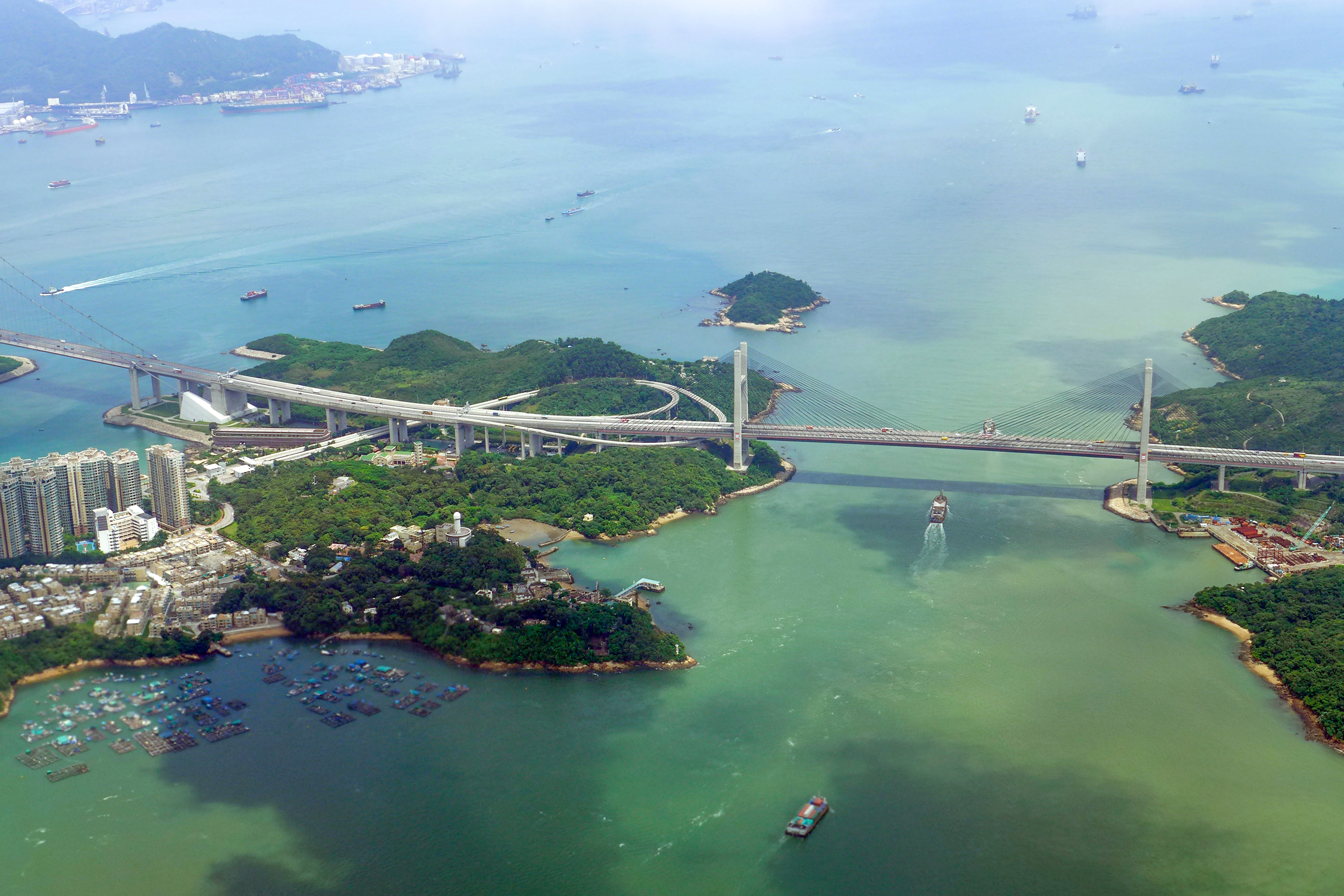
View of Ma Wan, with Tang Lung Chau in the upper part of the picture
