= Qianliyan Island =

Chinese island in the Yellow Sea

Native name: 千里岩
- Interactive map of Qianliyan Island

Geography
- Location: Yellow Sea
- Coordinates: 36°16′5.17″N 121°23′7.76″E
- Area: 1 km^{2} (0.39 sq mi)
- Highest elevation: 100 m (300 ft)

Administration
- China

Demographics
- Population: 3

Qianliyan Island
- Chinese: 千里岩
- Literal meaning: Thousand-Li Cliff
Transcriptions
Standard Mandarin
- Hanyu Pinyin: Qiānlǐyán
- Wade–Giles: Ch'ien-li-yen

Qianliyan Island is an island in the Yellow Sea about 80 kilometers (50 mi) east of Qingdao, Shandong, China. The area around the island is nationally protected by the Chinese government as an important spawning ground for local seafood.

== Name ==
Qianliyan is the pinyin romanization of the Chinese name, meaning "thousands of miles of rocks".

== Geography ==
Qianliyan is an isolated island in the Yellow Sea about 80 kilometers (50 mi) east of Qingdao. It is about 1 km^{2} (0.39 sq mi) in size with a maximum elevation below 100 meters (330 ft). It has few plants and little fresh water. The surrounding waters are protected by the Chinese government as an important spawning ground for local seafood.

== Structures ==
A scientific monitoring station was established in 1960. It is staffed by eight researchers working in rotation in teams of three, even through Chinese holidays. The sea's temperature, salinity, and wave activity is reported to China's State Oceanic Administration on an hourly basis. It is unable to be permanently staffed, as after the initial excitement of the posting the researchers found that "the overwhelming monotonousness is just suffocating."

Qianliyan Island is also the site of the Qianliyan Lighthouse, constructed in 1979.
