= West Lamma Channel =

Waterway on the west of Lamma Island in Hong Kong

Coordinates: 22°14′8.8″N 114°4′37.5″E

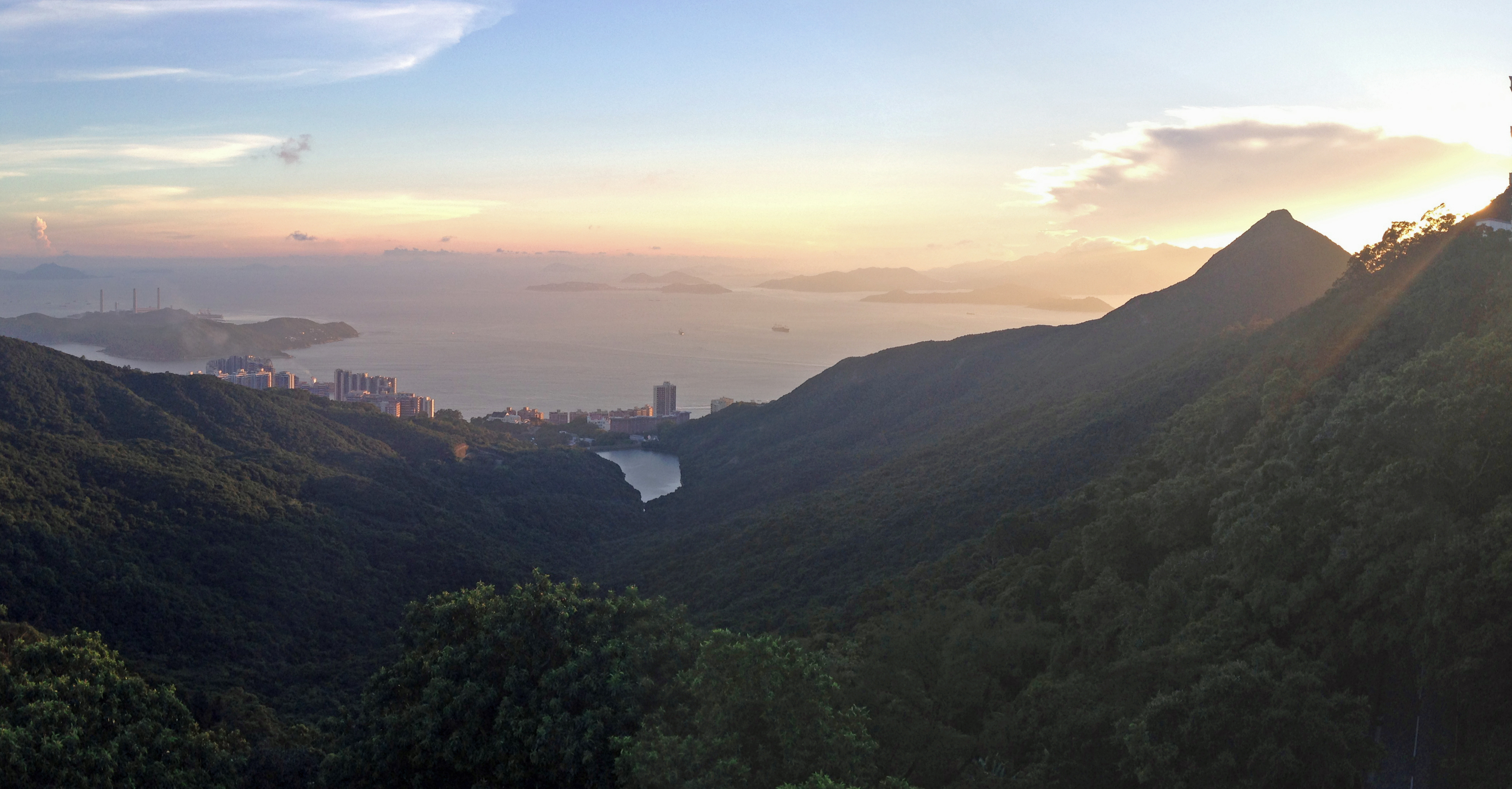
The West Lamma Channel at sunset.

The West Lamma Channel (Chinese: 西博寮海峽), officially The Soko Islands and West Lamma Channel, is a sea channel in Hong Kong.

== Extent ==
The Channel is defined in the Shipping and Port Control Regulations of Hong Kong, Eleventh Schedule, Part II, as being "The waters of Hong Kong ...":

"... bounded on the west by a straight line drawn from the northern extremity of Siu A Chau, latitude 22°11.292´ north, longitude 113°54.363´ east, to a small unnamed island (98 feet) in latitude 22°10.308´ north, longitude 113°53.996´ east thence a straight line drawn to a position at latitude 22°08.908´ north and longitude 113°53.930´ east.

... bounded on the south by a straight line drawn from position latitude 22°08.908´ north, longitude 113°53.930´ east, to a position latitude 22°08.908´ north, longitude 114°08.997´ east.

... bounded on the east by a straight line drawn 360° from a position at latitude 22°08.908´ north, longitude 114°08.997´ east to Yuen Kok, south eastern extremity of Lamma Island thence along the coast line from Yuen Kok to Wong Chuk Kok, thence by a straight line drawn from Wong Chuk Kok to a position at latitude 22°14.291´ north and longitude 114°07.347´ east.

... bounded on the north by a straight line drawn from the headland at latitude 22°14.475´ north, longitude 114°07.080´ east to the north eastern extremity of Cheung Chau Island, latitude 22°13.442´ north, longitude 114°02.097´ east, and a straight line drawn from the south western extremity of Cheung Chau Island, latitude 22°11.775´ north, longitude 114°01.297´ east, to the south western extremity of Shek Kwu Chau, latitude 22°11.308´ north, longitude 113°59.447´ east, thence a straight line drawn 270° to the northern extremity of Siu A Chau."

== See also ==
East Lamma Channel
