= Cape D'Aguilar Lighthouse =

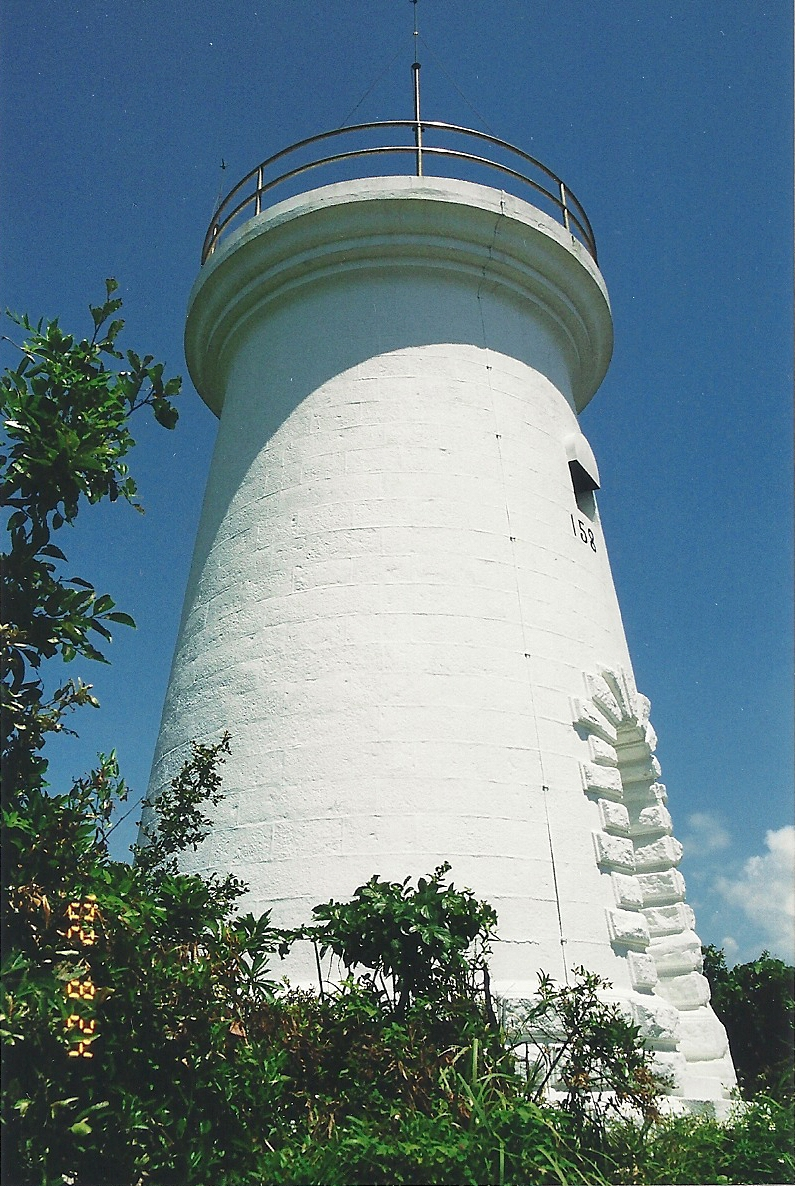
- Cape D'Aguilar Lighthouse
- Location: Cape D'Aguilar, Hong Kong Island, Stanley & Shek O, Southern District, Hong Kong, People's Republic of China
- Coordinates: 22°12′33″N 114°15′33″E

Tower
- Constructed: 1875
- Construction: stone
- Height: 9.7 m (32 ft)
- Shape: cylindrical tower with gallery, lantern removed and the light placed on a mast
- Markings: White
- Operator: Marine Department
- Heritage: declared monuments of Hong Kong

Light
- Deactivated: 1896-1975
- Focal height: 60 m (200 ft)
- Range: 20 nmi (37 km; 23 mi)
- Characteristic: Fl W 15s
- Hong Kong no.: HK-158

Cape D'Aguilar Lighthouse (Chinese: 鶴咀燈塔) is one of the declared monuments of Hong Kong. It is also known as Hok Tsui Beacon. The lighthouse is one of five pre-war surviving lighthouses in Hong Kong; it is also the oldest lighthouse in Hong Kong. Two of the five lighthouses are on Green Island while the other three are at Cape D'Aguilar, Waglan Island and Tang Lung Chau respectively. Waglan Lighthouse and Tang Lung Chau Lighthouse are also declared monuments of Hong Kong.

The lighthouse was named after Major-General Sir George Charles d'Aguilar and began service 6 April 1875. The light was a fixed dioptric first order Fresnel lens, emitting a white light on a focal plane of 200 feet (61 m) above sea level, that could be seen in clear weather 23 nautical miles (43 km; 26 mi). When the Waglan Island Lighthouse began operation in 1896 the Cape D'Aguilar light was rendered obsolete. In 1905 the light was removed and transferred to the Green Island Lighthouse to replace the forth order Fresnel light. In 1975 the Cape D'Aguilar was placed back into service with an automated system. The existing structure is 9.7 metres (32 ft) tall.
