= Bo'ao Lighthouse =

Lighthouse in Bo'ao, China

Bo'ao Lighthouse 博鳌灯塔
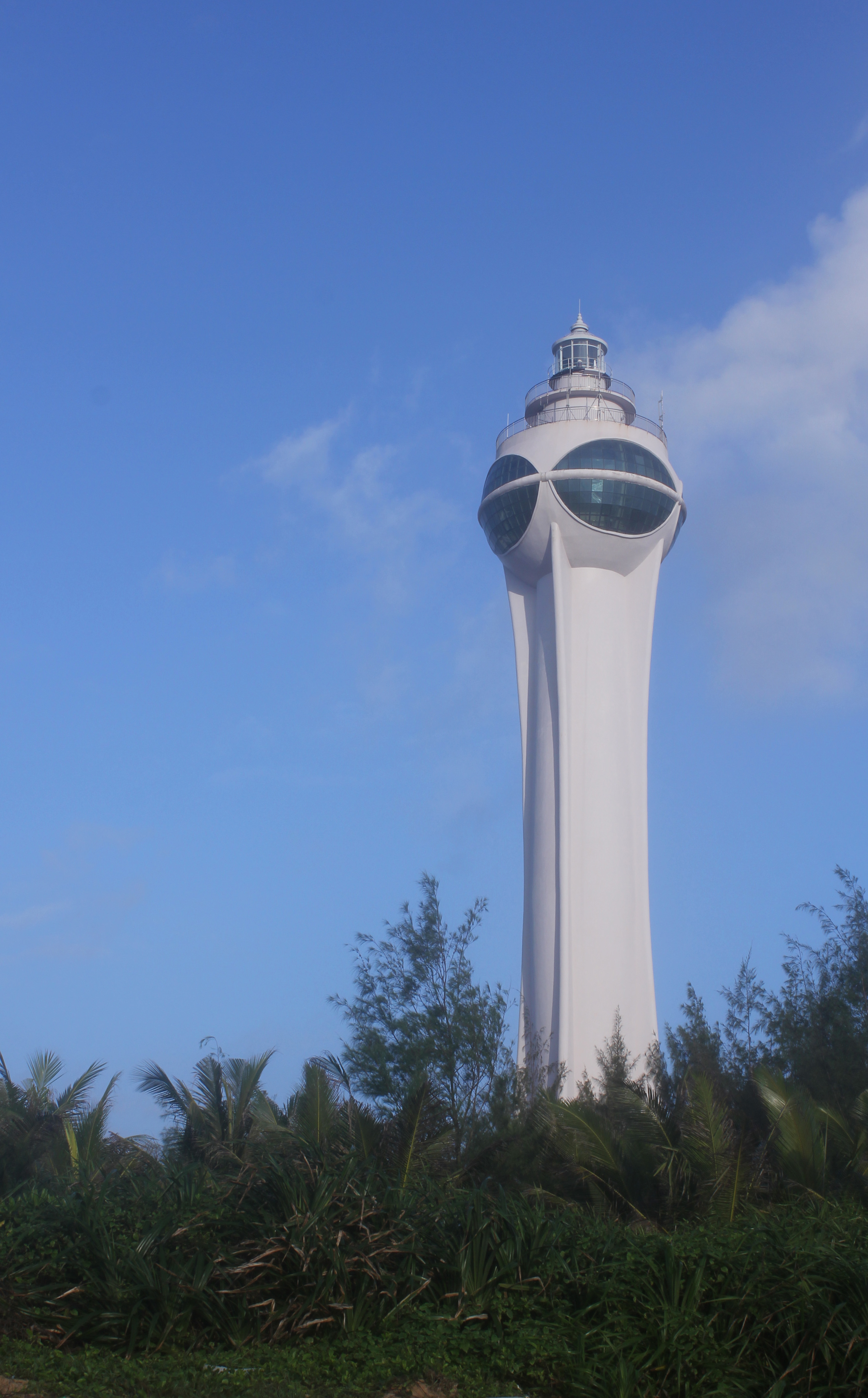
- Location: Bo'ao, Hainan, People's Republic of China
- Coordinates: 19.159625°N 110.585219°E

Tower
- Constructed: 2011
- Construction: Concrete tower
- Height: 23 metres
- Shape: Cylindrical tower with lantern and gallery
- Markings: White

Light
- First lit: 2011
- Focal height: 81 m (266 ft)
- Range: 35 km
- Characteristic: Fl(3) W 24s
- China no.: CN-5061

Bo'ao Lighthouse (Chinese: 博鳌灯塔) is situated on the north side of the entrance to the harbor at Bo'ao, Hainan, China. The tower is white in colour, round, with four ribs. It has a minimum diameter of six metres, a maximum of 38.5 metres, and is made of reinforced concrete. With the lantern and gallery atop, it has a total height of 23 metres.

Every nine seconds this lighthouse emits three white flashes. It has a range of 35 km.

It was built at the national level by the government of China. Construction started April 28, 2008 and it was put into service in 2011.
