= Swimming shed =

Changing rooms along a sea shore

Swimming sheds (Chinese: 泳棚) were built along the sea shore and provided changing rooms and wooden piers for swimmers. They took the form of bamboo huts and were built by the Hong Kong Government in the 20th century.

Swimming sheds gained popularity in the early 20th century because their entrance fees were cheap. Swimming sheds also leased swimwear, at a rate of HKD$0.3 for female swimming suits and cheaper for male swimming suits. This attracted many citizens to use swimming sheds during weekends and holidays.

== History ==
In 1911, Chinese Recreation Club (Hong Kong), built a swimming shed in Tsat Tsz Mui, formerly a village, in eastern North Point. It then became the most popular swimming resort, attracting more than 100 thousands of visitors every year.

In the 1950s, there were around 8 to 10 swimming sheds in Hong Kong. Among these swimming sheds, Chung Sing Swimming Shed and Kam Ngan Swimming Shed were the most famous, located in Kennedy Town and Mount Davis respectively. South China Athletic Association built a swimming shed in A Kung Ngam between 1950 and 1972. Many swimming sheds which provided boat rental service were also built in Lai Chi Kok Bay in northern Kowloon.

In the 1960s, the Hong Kong Government revoked part of the land area of the swimming shed in certain districts for redevelopment. As harbour pollution problem worsened, more swimming sheds were disintegrated and declined. In 1988, Wan Hung Fai, the regimental commander of beach cottage, and his friend's application to reopen a swimming shed in Sai Wan Victoria Road was approved by the Hong Kong Government, making Sai Wai Swimming Shed the one and only swimming shed in Hong Kong now. There are offices, changing rooms, and lockers. It is open to the public from 5:00 am to 1:00 pm and charges HKD$120 per month.

On 22 October 2012, Leung Chun-ying, the Chief Executive of Hong Kong, pointed out that the water quality of the harbour had been improving since all major sewage treatment and purification projects were nearly completed. He suggested building more swimming sheds on both sides of the harbour, and in turn encouraging people, particularly those working on both sides of the Victoria Harbour, to swim or do a little fishing to reduce stress. However, Professor Ho Kin-chung, Dean of the School of Science and Technology in the Open University of Hong Kong, indicated that the water quality is not suitable for swimming until the second phase of the effluent treatment projects is complete. He agrees that it is feasible to build swimming sheds in both sides of the Victoria Harbour because many citizens swim in Hung Hom and North Point with no facilities provided.

== Tourist spot ==
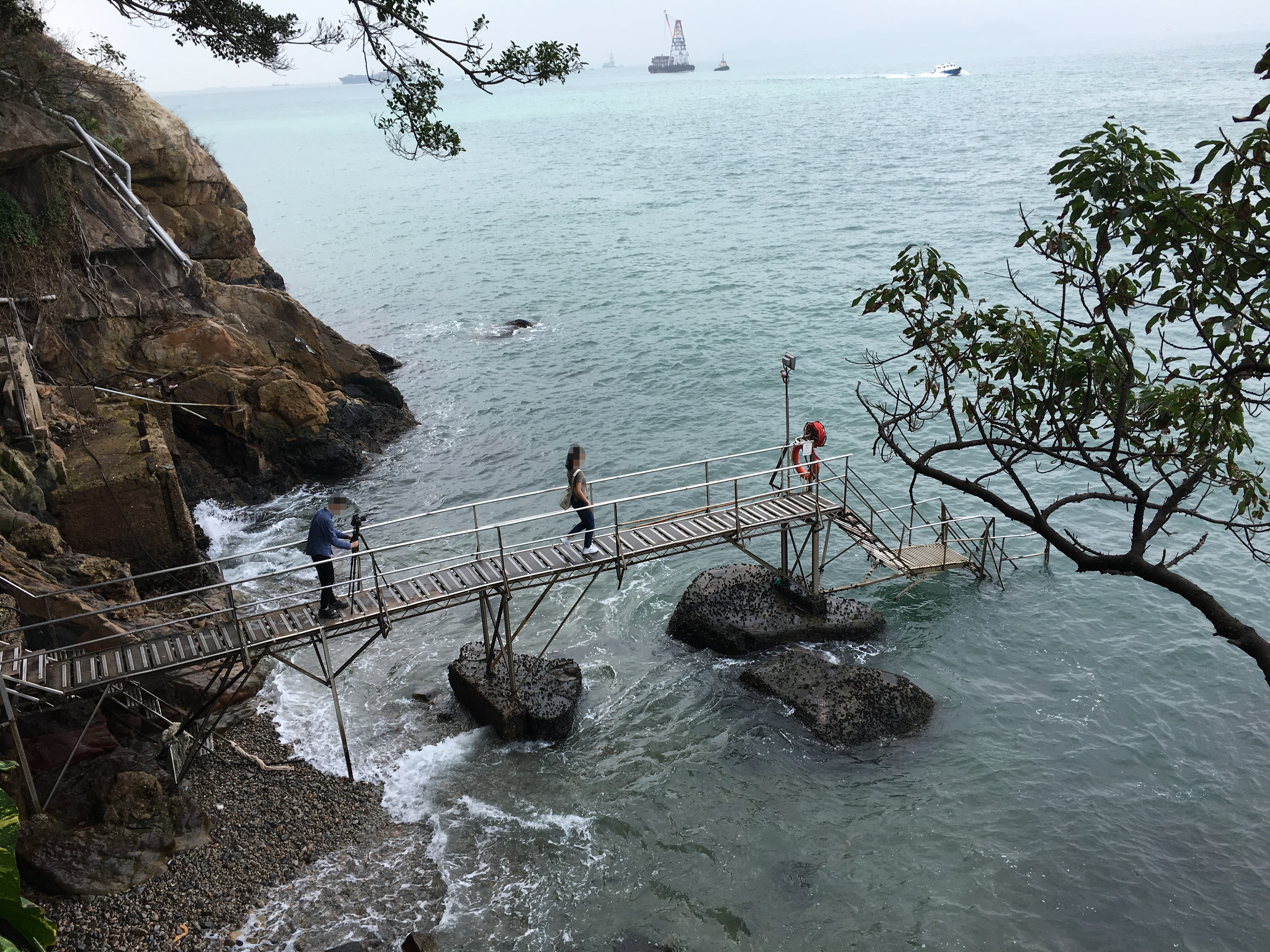
Sai Wan Swimming Shed

The swimming shed is still used by older swimmers and residents of the neighbourhood early in the morning. It is also a popular photo location among enthusiasts and newlyweds.

=== Sai Wan Swimming Shed ===
Sai Wan Swimming Shed is the only shed that is still in service in Hong Kong. It was created by the government in the 1960s to 1970s when regular swimming facilities weren't common. It is on the edge of the Hong Kong Island, outlining the Victoria Road and Mount Davis. It functions as a hybrid of swimming lot and spot for photography lovers, as its vantage point helps visitors see the small island to the West of the shed, the beacon and the sunset. Users could also get changed and store their personal belongings in the shed. After settling down, swimmers walk along the shed and start enjoying their laps.

== Accidents ==
On 29 September 2007 in Victoria Road and Deep Water Bay, a swimmer drowned in an early morning accident. The swimmer, who worked in Sai Wan Swimming Shed, was swimming after work. She was sent to hospital after being rescued but died that night. Another woman drowned while swimming at Deep Water Bay.

Two elderly women drowned yesterday morning when swimming. A woman (Ms Zhang, 70) from the Swimming Shed drowned.

That accident happened at the Victoria Road Old Mount Village beach. It was administered by two committees. Members are mostly elders and are interested in early swimming and winter swimming. There is no lifeguard at the Swimming Shed. Swimmers only take care of their friends. Sometimes when vessels pass the sea waves can be rather high, though local people are accustomed to large waves. They said that they do not travel too far as that is dangerous.
