= List of tunnels and bridges in Hong Kong =

This is a list of tunnels and bridges in Hong Kong.

== Road ==
=== Road tunnels ===
==== Victoria Harbour crossings ====
Tunnel	Opened	Length (km)	Franchise lasts until	Owner/operator	Cost for motorcycles/taxis/cars/minibuses/ buses/lorries (HK$)	Vehicles daily (as at 2023)	Capacity per day
Cross-Harbour Tunnel Map	1972	1.86	1999	Hong Kong Government/Serco Group (HK) Limited	8/25/30/10/15/15-30	107,122	78 500
Eastern Harbour Crossing Map	1989	2.2	2008 (Rail) 2016 (Road)	Hong Kong Government/Pacific Infrastructure Limited	13/25/30/38/75/38-75	75,230	78 500
Western Harbour Crossing Map	1997	2	2023	Hong Kong Government/Pacific Infrastructure Limited	25/25/60/85/200/85-140	64,185	118 000

==== Tunnels on Hong Kong Island ====
Tunnel	Opened	Length (km)	Franchise lasts until	Owner/operator	Cost for taxis/cars/minibuses/ buses/lorries (HK$)	Vehicles daily (As at 2021)	Capacity per day
Aberdeen Tunnel Map	1982/1983	1.85		Hong Kong Government / Transport Infrastructure Management Limited	8 (Flat toll)	60,837 (as of 2021)	
Central–Wan Chai Bypass	2019	4.5	N/A	Hong Kong Government / Chun Wo Tunnel Management Limited	Toll-free	47,707	N/A

==== Tunnels in New Kowloon ====
Tunnel	Opened	Length (km)	Franchise lasts until	Owner/operator	Cost for taxis/cars/minibuses/ buses/lorries (HK$)	Vehicles daily	Capacity per day
Kai Tak Tunnel, formerly known as Airport Tunnel Map	1982	1.26		Hong Kong Government / Greater Lucky (H.K.) Company Limited	Toll-free	52,990 (As of 2021)	
Kai San Road	2017	0.57			Toll-free		

==== Tunnels between New Kowloon and the New Territories ====
Tunnel	Opened	Length (km)	Franchise lasts until	Owner/operator	Cost for taxis/cars/minibuses/ buses/lorries (HK$)	Vehicles daily (As at 2021)	Capacity per day
Eagle's Nest Tunnel Map & Sha Tin Heights Tunnel Map	2008	2.7, 0.95		Hong Kong Government / TIML MOM Limited	8 (Flat toll)	60,747	120,000
Lion Rock Tunnel Map	1967	1.43		Hong Kong Government / Greater Lucky (H.K.) Company Limited	8 (Flat toll)	89,583	
Second Lion Rock Tunnel Map	1978	1.41		Hong Kong Government / Greater Lucky (H.K.) Company Limited	8 (Flat toll)	89,583	
Tate's Cairn Tunnel Map	1991	3.9	2018	Hong Kong Government / Pacific Infrastructure Management Limited	14/14/21/28-31/21-25	61,571	
Tseung Kwan O Tunnel Map	1990	0.9		Hong Kong Government / Greater Lucky (H.K.) Company Limited	Free	96,172	
Tseung Kwan O-Lam Tin Tunnel	2022	2.2	—	Hong Kong Government	Free	—	—

==== Tunnels in the New Territories ====
Tunnel	Opened	Length (km)	Franchise lasts until	Owner/operator	Cost for Motorcycles / taxis / cars / minibuses / buses / lorries (HK$)	Vehicles daily (As in 2021)	Capacity per day
Shing Mun Tunnels Map (east) Map (west)	1990	2.6		Hong Kong Government / Greater Lucky (H.K.) Company Limited	8 (Flat toll)	52,349	
Tai Lam Tunnel Map	1998	3.8	2025	Hong Kong Government / Transport Infrastructure Management Limited	7.2-18 / 18-45 / 28/ 43	45,392	140,000
Cheung Tsing Tunnel Map	1997	1.65		Hong Kong Government / TIML MOM Limited	Toll-free	83 000	
Discovery Bay Tunnel Map	2000	0.63	N/A	HKR International Limited	50 for government cars and buses, 120 for light class goods vehicles, 160 for medium class goods vehicles, 250 for heavy and all other classes (motorcycles, taxis, private cars are disallowed)	612	520
Tai Wai Tunnel Map	2007	0.5	N/A	Hong Kong Government / TIML MOM Limited	8 (Incorporated into toll fee of Eagle's Nest Tunnel & Sha Tin Heights Tunnel)	N/A	N/A
Nam Wan Tunnel Map	2009	1.25	N/A	Hong Kong Government / TIML MOM Limited	Toll-free	N/A	N/A
Scenic Hill Tunnel	2018	1	N/A	Hong Kong Government / Transport Infrastructure Management Limited	Toll-free	466	N/A
Airport Tunnel	2018	0.6	N/A	Hong Kong Government / Transport Infrastructure Management Limited	Toll-free	401	N/A
Lung Shan Tunnel	2019	4.8	N/A	Hong Kong Government / Transport Infrastructure Management Limited	Toll-free	16,728	N/A
Cheung Shan Tunnel	2019	0.9	N/A	Hong Kong Government / Transport Infrastructure Management Limited	Toll-free	4688	N/A
Tuen Mun–Chek Lap Kok Link	2020	5.5	N/A	Hong Kong Government / Transport Infrastructure Management Limited	Toll-free	17,548	N/A

==== Tunnels under construction or planned ====
Tunnel	Scheduled year of completion	Length (km)	Location
Central Kowloon Bypass	(Opened in Dec 2025)	4.7	Kowloon-New Kowloon
Trunk Road T2 and Cha Kwo Ling Tunnel	2026	3	New Kowloon
Tuen Mun West Bypass	N/A	8.4	New Territories

=== Notable underpasses ===
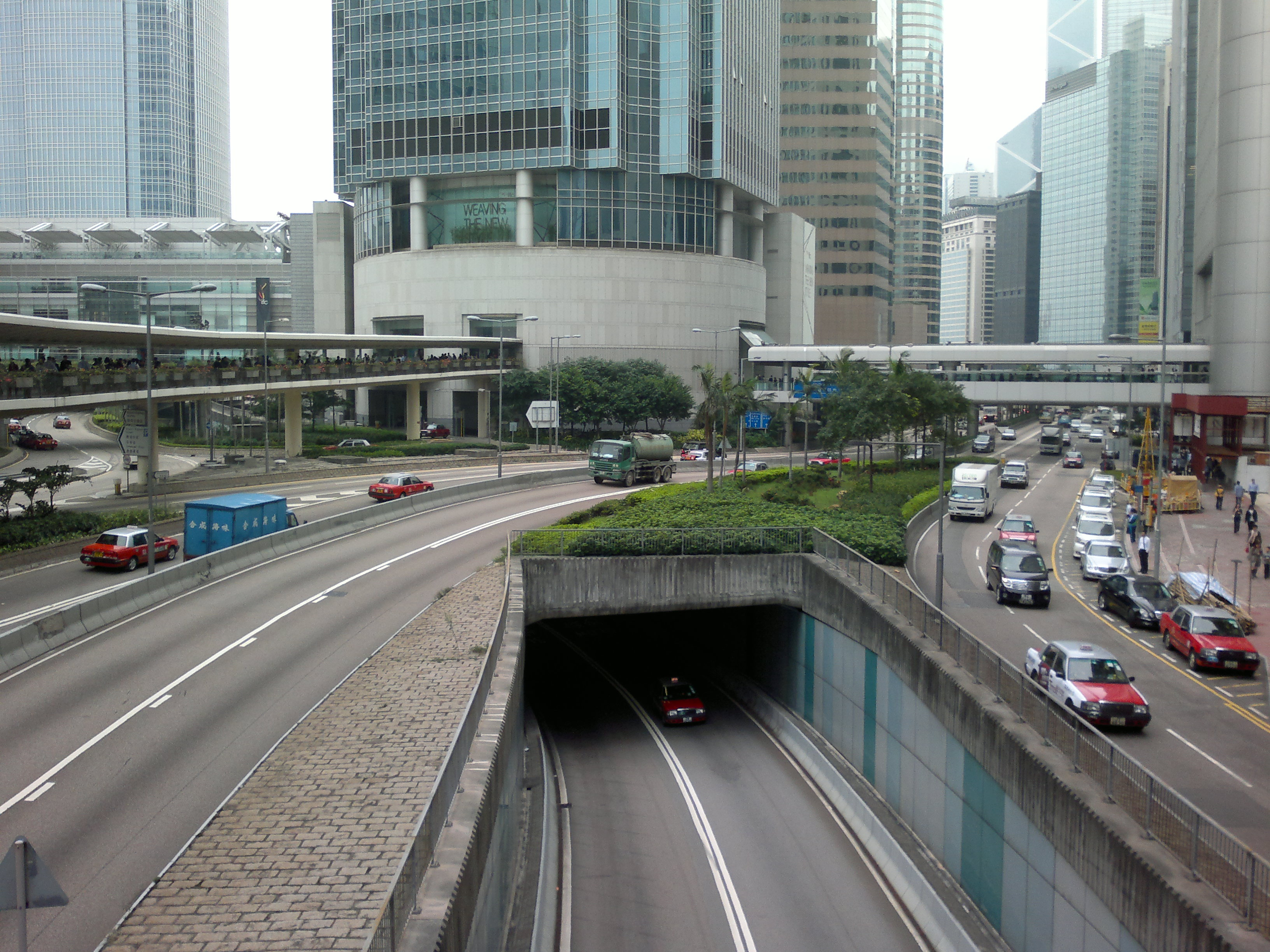
Man Cheung Street Underpass across Connaught Road Central

- Pedder Street Underpass
- Smithfield Underpass
- Salisbury Road Underpass
- Chung Cheung Road
- Lin Cheung Road Underpass
- Man Cheung Street Underpass
- Winslow Street Underpass
- Chatham Road South-Gilles Avenue South Underpass
- Sai Sha Road Ma On Shan Underpass
- Sai Sha Road Clear Water Bay Underpass
- Tsing Yi Road-Kwai Tsing Bridge Underpass
- Yi Pei Chun Road Underpass
- Wo Yi Hop Road Underpass
- Austin Road West Underpass

=== Road bridges ===
There are about 1300 vehicular bridges in Hong Kong.

Major bridges in Hong Kong
Name	Year opened	Length (m)	Franchise expiry	Owner/operator	Toll	Daily traffic	Daily capacity
Tsing Ma Bridge	1997	1,377		Hong Kong Government / TIML MOM Limited	No	94,185 (as of Aug 2019)	
Kap Shui Mun Bridge	1997	1,323		Hong Kong Government / TIML MOM Limited	No	94,185 (as of Aug 2019)	
Ting Kau Bridge	1998	1,177		Hong Kong Government / TIML MOM Limited	No		
Tsing Yi Bridge	1974	610		Hong Kong Government	No		
Ap Lei Chau Bridge	1980	230		Hong Kong Government	No		
Second Ap Lei Chau Bridge	1994	230		Hong Kong Government	No		
Liu To Bridge	1987?	175		Hong Kong Government	No		
Hong Kong–Shenzhen Western Corridor	2007	5,500		Hong Kong Government / Government of People's Republic of China	No		
Stonecutters Bridge	2009	1,596		Hong Kong Government / TIML MOM Limited	No		
Cheung Tsing Bridge	1977	600		Hong Kong Government / TIML MOM Limited	No		
Lai Chi Kok Bridge	1968	790		Hong Kong Government	No	82,560	
Tsing Yi North Bridge	1987	1,015		Hong Kong Government	No	41,680	
Hong Kong–Zhuhai–Macau Bridge	2018	29,600		Hong Kong Government / Government of People's Republic of China	Yes	10,812	
Tseung Kwan O Cross Bay Bridge	2022	1,800			No		

=== Other road bridges and viaducts ===
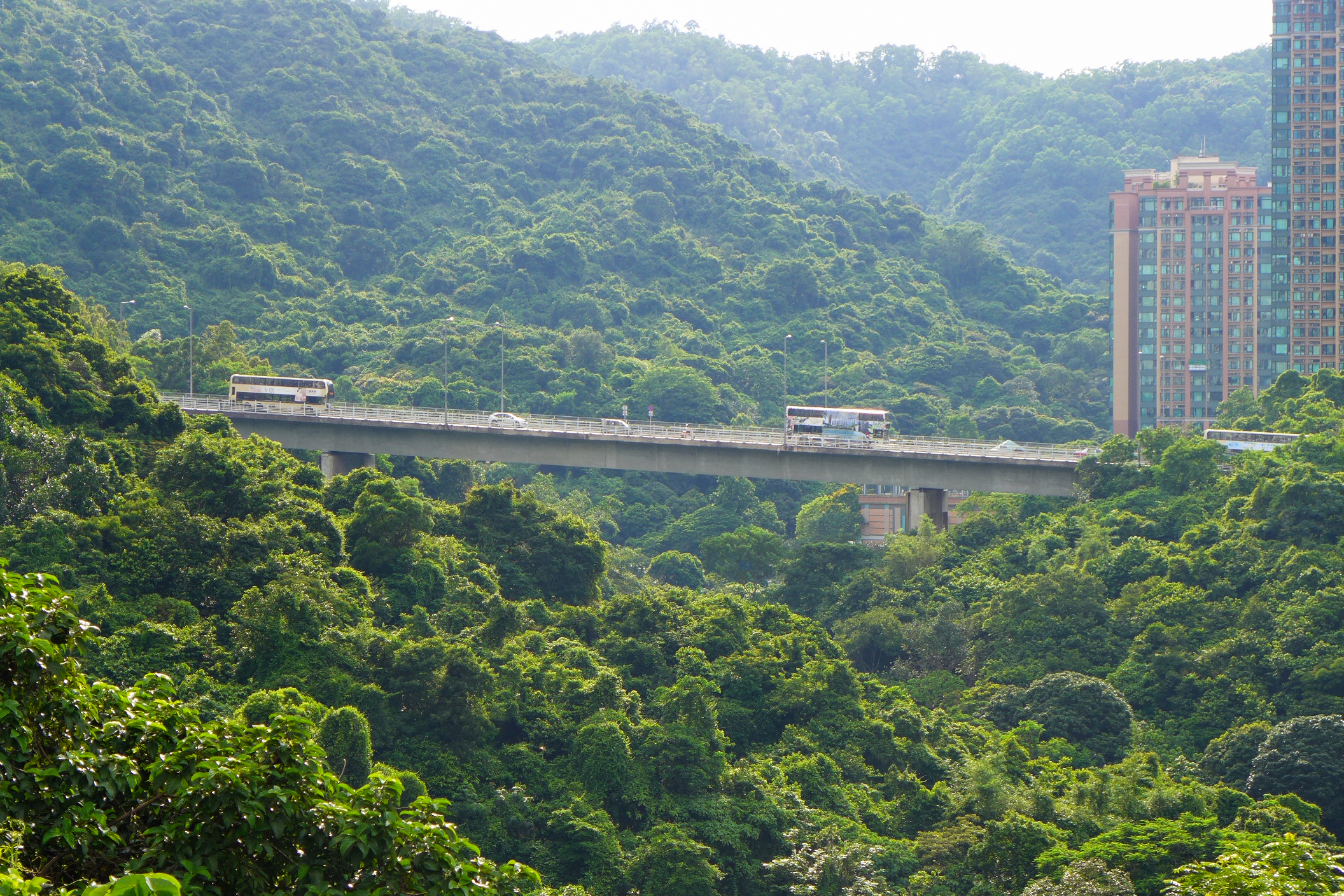
Liu To Bridge in July 2017

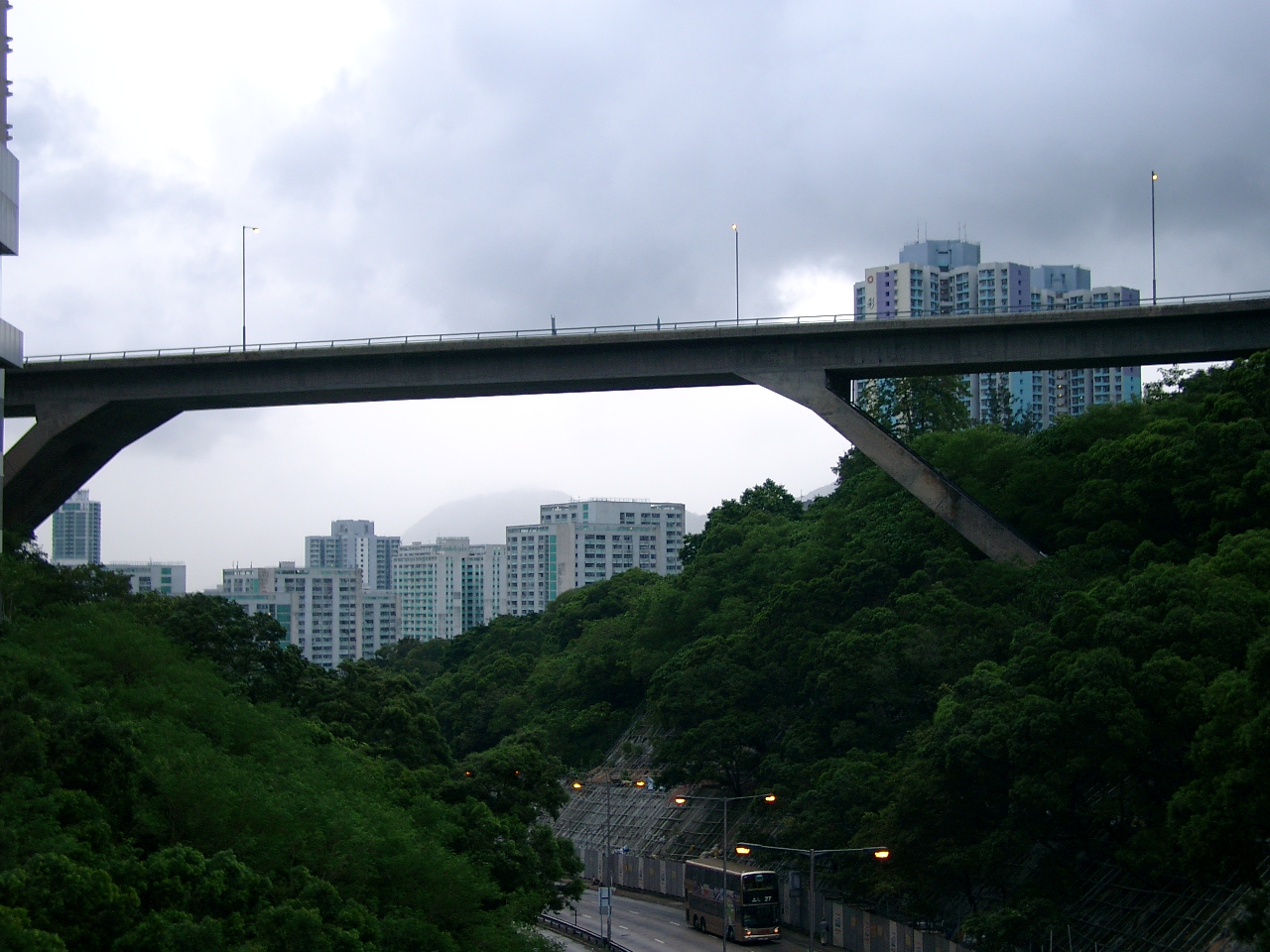
The spiral loop of New Clear Water Bay Road in August 2006

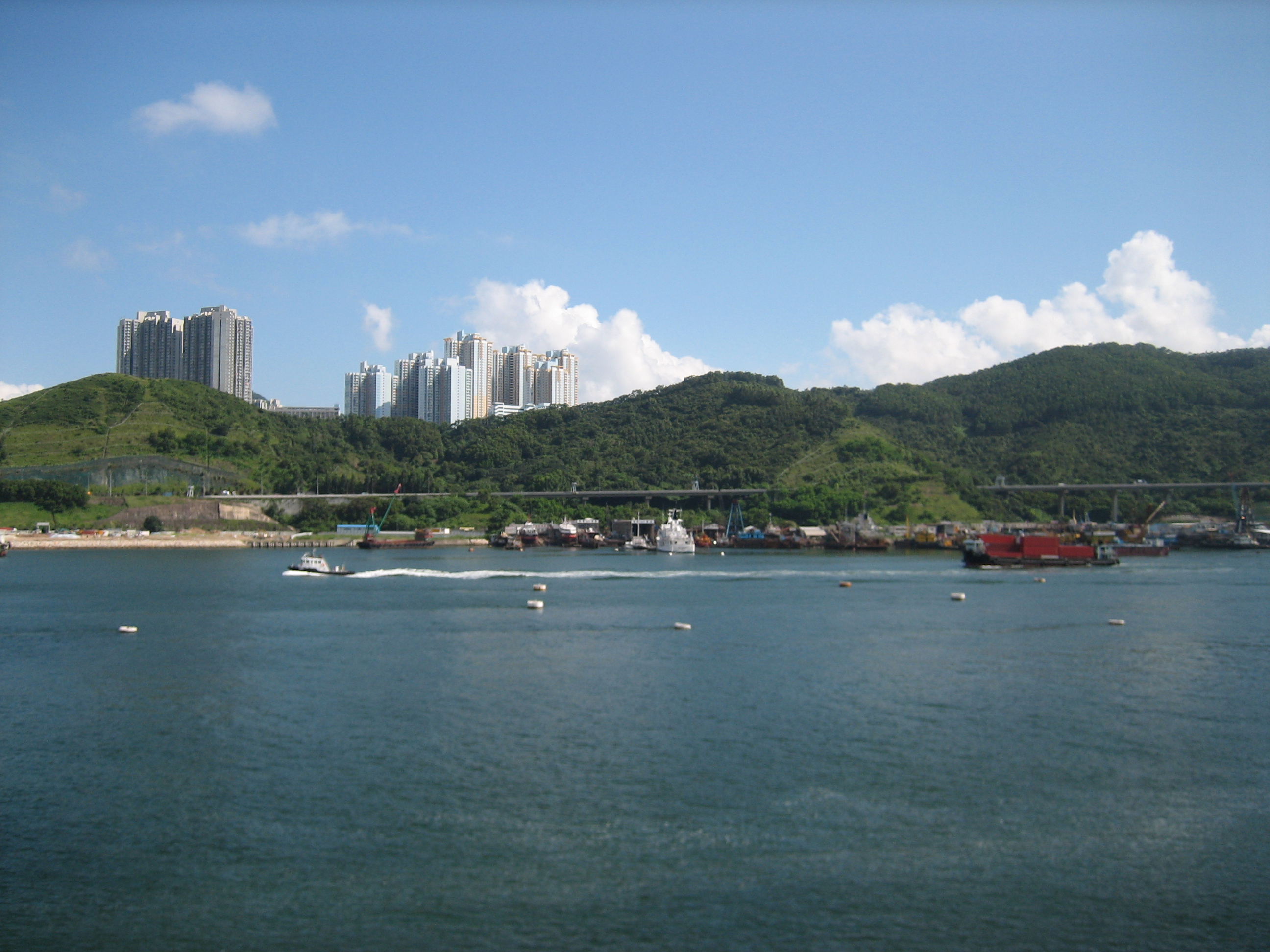
Tsing Yi North Coastal Road viewed from the Tsuen Wan coastline in July 2008

- Banyan Bridge
- Bridge on Bowen Road
- Broadwood Road
- Castle Peak Road – New Tai Lam
- Choi Yee Bridge
- Dragon Bridge
- Hung Hom Bypass
- Island Eastern Corridor
- Kwun Tong Bypass
- Lai Chi Kok Bridge
- Lion Bridge
- Lok Ma Chau Bridge (cross-border)
- Mount Kellett Road Flyover
- New Clear Water Bay Road
- Sand Martin Bridge
- Tsing Yi North Coastal Road
- Tsuen Wan Road

Former bridges

- Kwong Fuk Bridge

== Pedestrian-only ==
=== Footbridges ===
- Kwong Fuk Bridge over Lam Tsuen River
- Footbridge over Leighton Road
- Lek Yuen Bridge over Shing Mun River Channel
- Footbridge between Lo Wu Control Point and Luohu Port (cross-border; over Sham Chun River)
- Footbridge between Lok Ma Chau Spur Line Control Point and Futian Port (cross-border; over Sham Chun River)
- Several masonry bridges of Pokfulam Reservoir
- A masonry bridge of Tai Tam Upper Reservoir
- Several masonry bridges of Tai Tam Tuk Reservoir
- Footbridge Network in Tsuen Wan.

== Railway ==
=== Railway tunnels ===
Various tunnels were built for the KCR network now leased to the MTRC:

- Beacon Hill Tunnel
- Tunnel No. 5
- Tsuen Wan line immersed tube
- Tunnel No. 1A
- Tunnel No. 5A
- Eastern Harbour Crossing
- Lok Ma Chau Spur Line
- Kwai Tsing Tunnels (Tsing Tsuen Tunnels and Ha Kwai Chung Tunnels)
- Tai Lam Tunnel (Tuen Ma line)

Tunnels of the MTR:

- Airport Railway immersed tube
- Nam Fung Tunnel
- Lei Tung Tunnel
- Tunnels between Tsing Yi station and Tsing Ma Bridge
- Tunnel to the west of Kap Shui Mun Bridge

Tunnels owned by the KCRC leased to the MTRC:

- Lion Rock Tunnel (Tuen Ma line)
- East Rail line Cross-Harbour extension (Shatin to Central Link Cross-Harbour section; Contract 1121)

Underground sections of MTR:

- Kwun Tong line:
  - Whampoa – Choi Hung
  - Lam Tin – Tiu Keng Leng (Black Hill Tunnels)
- Tsuen Wan line:
  - Central – Lai King
  - Around Tai Wo Hau
- Island line: Kennedy Town – Heng Fa Chuen
- Tuen Ma line: Hin Keng – Tsuen Wan West (including Lion Rock Tunnel mentioned above; after Tsuen Wan West the railway line continue onto Tai Lam Tunnel and Kwai Tsing Tunnels mentioned above), except for the section near Nam Cheong and Hung Hom
- Tseung Kwan O line: Entire line (except a short section between Lohas Park and Pak Shing Kok Tunnel)

High-speed rail:

- Hong Kong Express Rail Link: Entire line

Former tunnels:

- Tunnel No. 1
- Tunnel No. 3
- Tunnel No. 4
- Old Beacon Hill Tunnel
- A tunnel near Tong To Village on the former Sha Tau Kok Railway

The Hong Kong International Airport Automated People Mover also features tunnel portions.

=== Railway bridges and viaducts ===
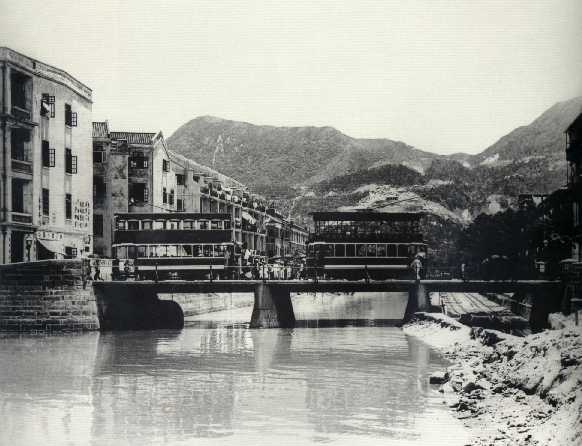
Trams crossing Bowrington Canal in the 1920s

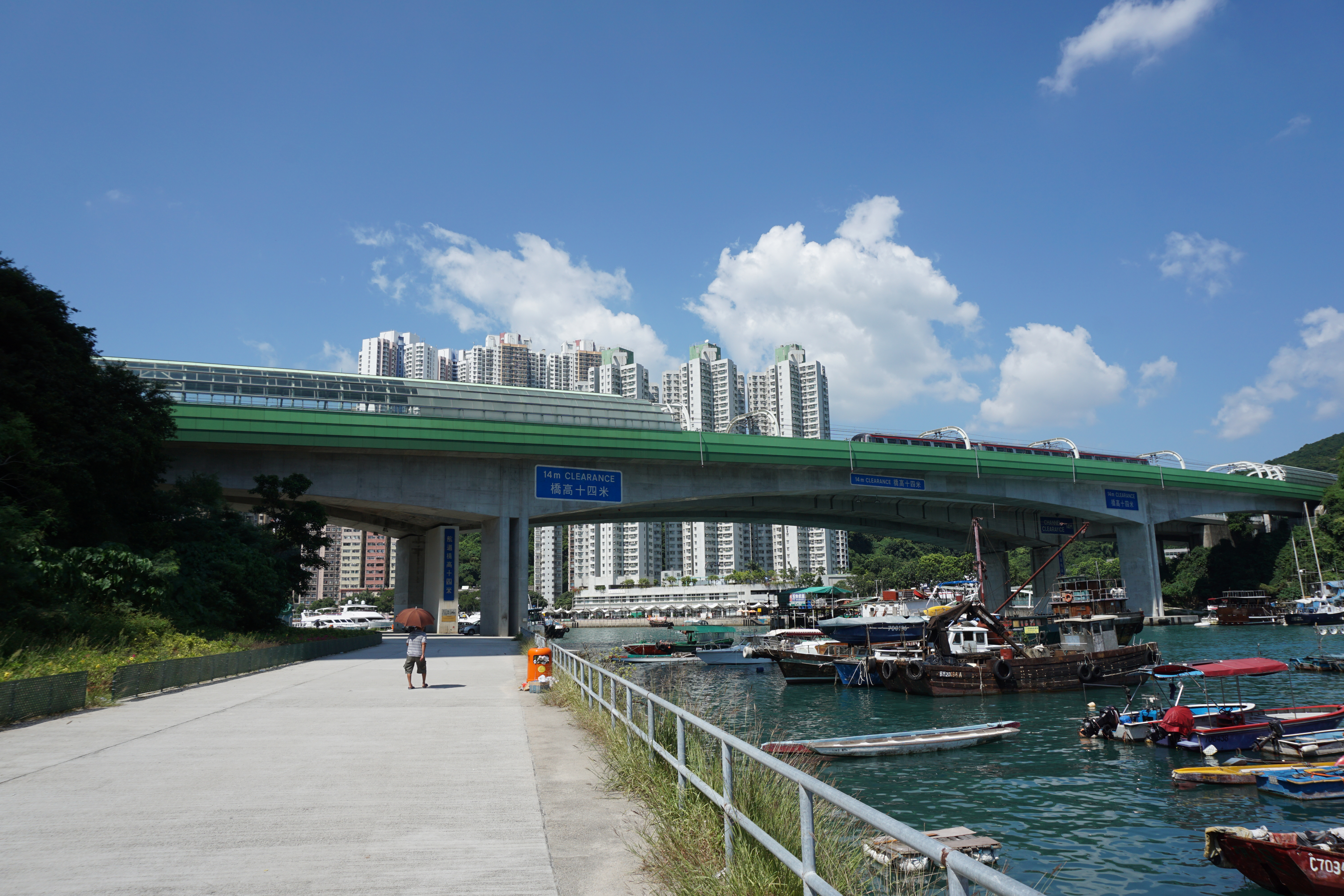
Aberdeen Channel Bridge in October 2016

==== MTR ====
===== East Rail line / Through Train =====
- Lo Wu Bridge
- Bridge over Lam Tsuen River
- Bridge over Tai Po River (three tracks)
- Bridge over Tai Wai Nullah
- Bridge over Fo Tan Nullah (five tracks)
- Bridge over Cheung Shui Tam (near the junction of Yau King Lane and Cheung Tai Road; decommissioned)

===== Island line =====
- Heng Fa Chuen – Chai Wan Viaduct

===== Kwun Tong line =====
- Kowloon Bay – Lam Tin Viaduct

===== Tuen Ma line =====
- Tai Wai – Shek Mun Viaduct (including a section over the Siu Lek Yuen Nullah)
- Tai Shui Hang – Wu Kai Sha Viaduct
- A road-rail bridge (with Ma On Shan Road) over Nui Po Tung Hang
- Kam Sheung Road–Tuen Mun Viaduct (longest bridge/viaduct in Hong Kong)

===== South Island line =====
- Ocean Park – Wong Chuk Hang Viaduct
- Aberdeen Channel Bridge

===== Tsuen Wan line =====
- Kwai Fong – Kwai Hing Viaduct

===== Lantau Railway (Tung Chung line / Airport Express) =====
- Kap Shui Mun Bridge
- Ma Wan Viaduct
- Tsing Lai Bridge
- Tsing Ma Bridge
- Railway bridge between Lantau Island & Chek Lap Kok Island

===== Light Rail =====
- Hoi Wong Road over Tuen Mun River
- Castle Peak Road – Hung Shui Kiu over Hung Shui River
- Castle Peak Road – Yuen Long over Yuen Long Nullah
- Pui To Road over Tuen Mun River
- Fung Tei Station to Siu Hong Station over Tuen Mun River
- Bridge across the junction of Tin Wah Road and Tin Shui Road

==== Peak Tram ====
- Bridge over Kennedy Road

==== Tram ====
- Bowrington Bridge over Bowrington Canal (subsumed)

==== Former Sha Tau Kok Railway ====
- Various bridges, including one in Wo Hang, one in Shek Au Chung and another in Ma Tseuk Leng

== Others ==
=== Other tunnels ===
==== Drainage tunnels ====
- Hong Kong West Drainage Tunnel
  - Po Shan Drainage Tunnel
- Lai Chi Kok Drainage Tunnel
- Tsuen Wan Drainage Tunnel

==== Tunnels for electricity cables ====
- Nam Fung–Parker Tunnel‌ (5.7 km (3.5 miles))
- Wah Fu–Bowen Tunnel (3.1 km (1.9 miles))
- Castle Peak Cable Tunnel (2.796 miles (4.5 km))
- Sham Tseng to Ma Wan Cable Crossing
- Lantau to Ma Wan Cable Crossing

==== Tunnels for gas pipes ====
- Old Beacon Hill Tunnel
- Braemar Hill Tunnel

==== Tunnels for seawater cooling ====
- Hongkong Bank Seawater Tunnel
- The Excelsior Seawater Tunnel (pipes removed)

==== Sewerage tunnels ====
- Harbour Area Treatment Scheme – two tunnels beneath Victoria Harbour
- Tolo Harbour Effluent Export Scheme

==== Water supplies tunnels ====
- High Island Water Tunnels
- Inter-reservoirs Transfer Scheme between Kowloon Byewash Reservoir and Lower Shing Mun Reservoir
- Kornhill Tunnel
- Lion Rock Tunnel
- Second Lion Rock Tunnel
- Pok Fu Lam Tunnel
- Shek Pik Scheme Water Tunnels
- Tai Lam Chung Tunnels (Tai Lam Chung to Chai Wan Kok to Tsing Lung Tau)
- Tai Tam Tunnel (Tai Tam to Wong Nai Chung)
- Tung Chung Tunnel

==== Mining tunnels ====
- Lin Ma Hang
- Ma On Shan
- West Brother Island

=== Other bridges ===
- A series of aqueducts on the Pokfulam Conduit
- Bowen Aqueduct
- Tai Tam Upper Reservoir Masonry Aqueduct

== See also ==
- Transport in Hong Kong
- Vehicular harbour crossings in Hong Kong
- List of railway bridges and viaducts in Hong Kong
- Hong Kong–Zhuhai–Macau Bridge
- Category:Railway tunnels in Hong Kong
