= Rambler Channel Typhoon Shelter =

Typhoon shelter in Hong Kong

Coordinates: 22.3453°N 114.1178°E

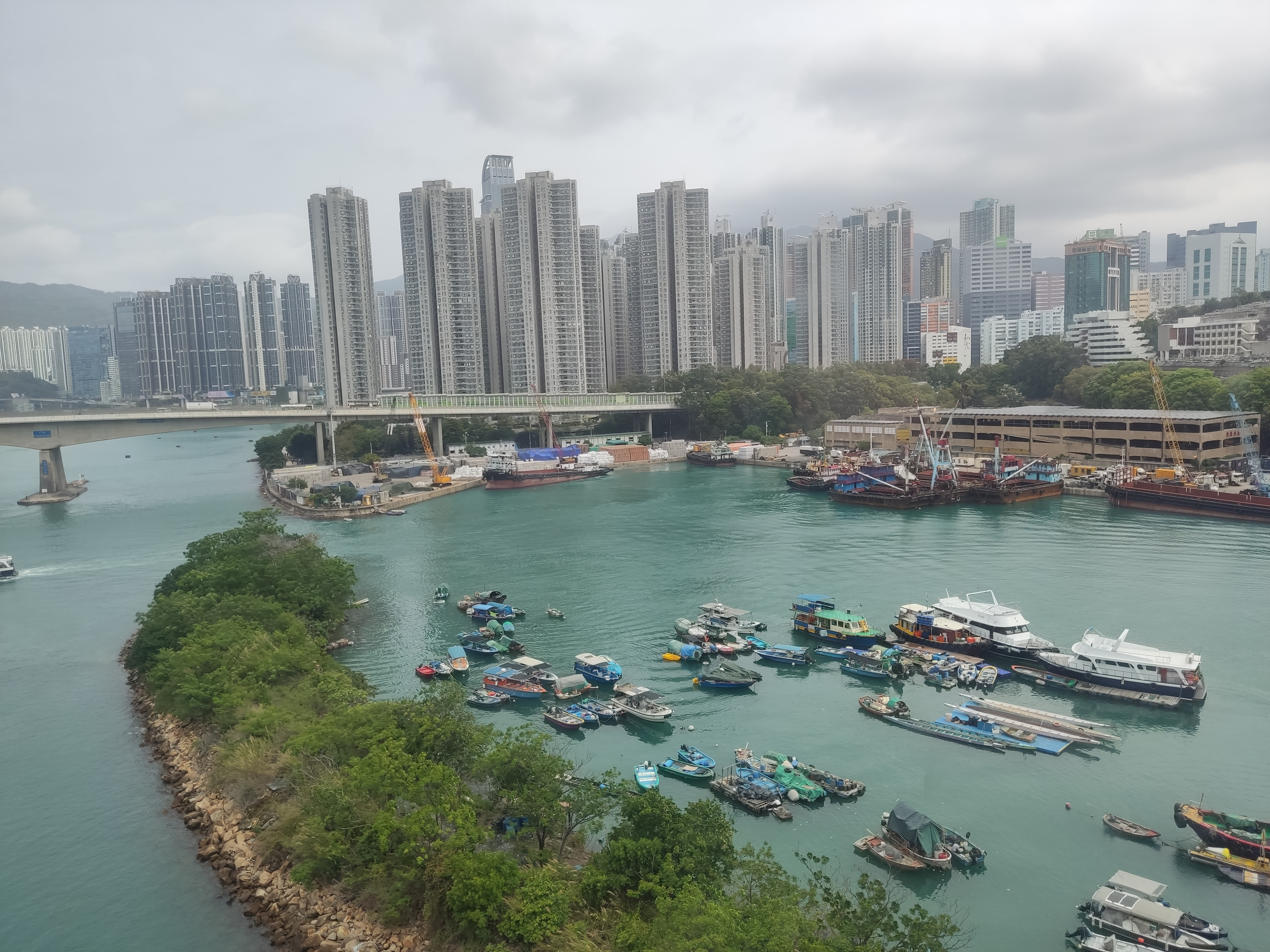
Rambler Channel Typhoon Shelter.

Rambler Channel Typhoon Shelter (Chinese: 藍巴勒海峽避風塘) is a typhoon shelter in the Rambler Channel, near Kwai Chung, Hong Kong. It was built in 1966 with a size of 16 hectares (40 acres). In 2004 the typhoon shelter was 13 hectares (32 acres) in size.

Rambler Channel Public Cargo Working Area (藍巴勒海峽公眾貨物裝卸區) is just inside the typhoon shelter for ships loading and unloading cargo.

== See also ==
- List of typhoon shelters in Hong Kong
