= Kwai Chung Incineration Plant =

Incinerator in New Territories, Hong Kong

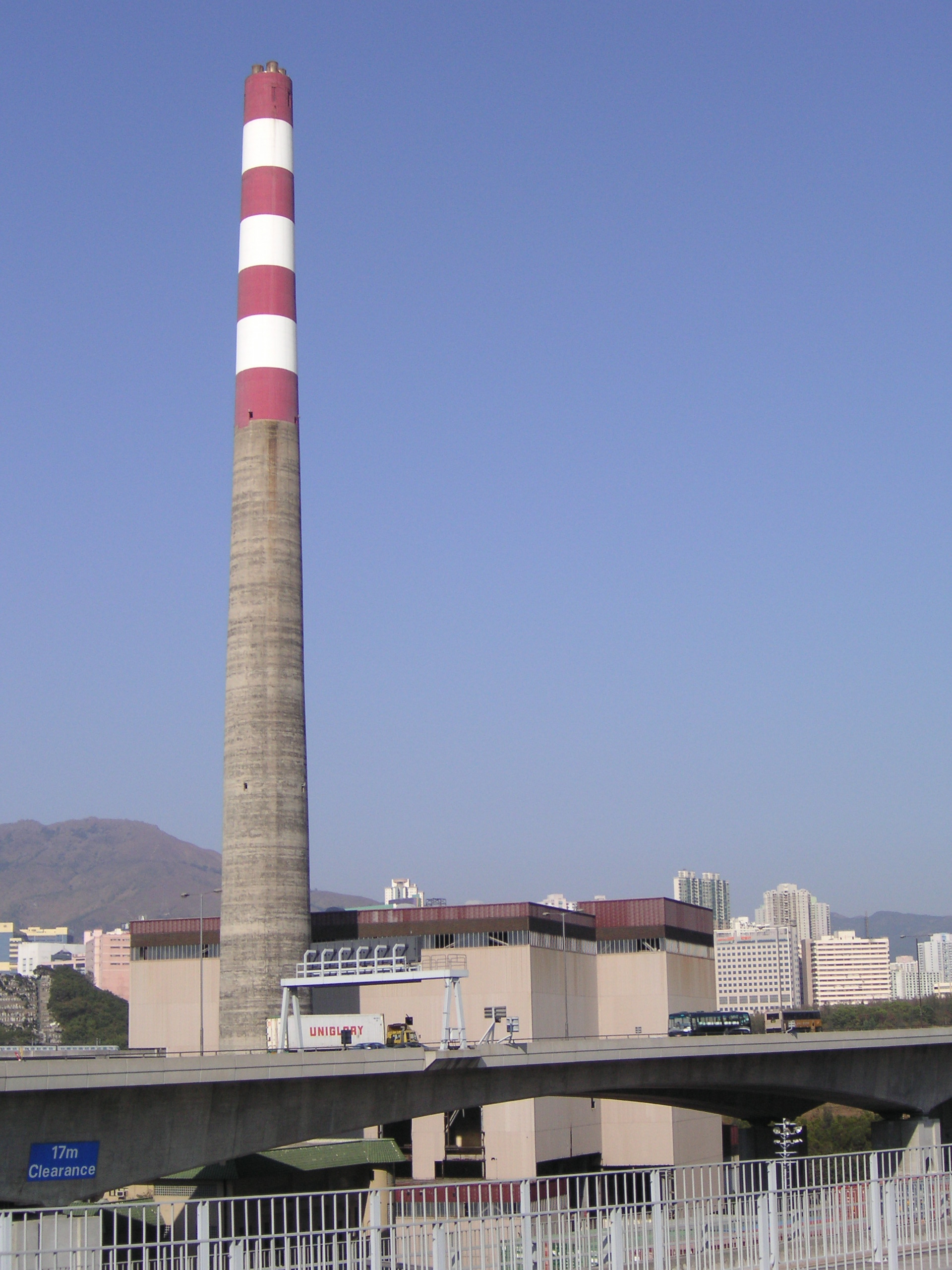
- Kwai Chung Incineration Plant, with Rambler Channel Bridge in foreground

- Location within Hong Kong

General information
- Status: Demolished
- Location: Gin Drinkers Bay, Kwai Chung; New Territories, Hong Kong
- Coordinates: 22.350999°N 114.115241°E
- Opened: October 1978
- Closed: May 1997
- Demolished: 2007–2011
- Owner: Government of Hong Kong

Height
- Height: 150 metres (490 ft)

Kwai Chung Incineration Plant (Chinese: 葵涌焚化爐) was one of four incineration plants in Hong Kong. The plant was built on a 1.4 hectares (3.5 acres) of reclaimed land along Gin Drinkers Bay, Kwai Chung, near Pillar Island and the Rambler Channel.

The plant was opened in 1978 to process solid waste from Hong Kong to reduce the need to put waste into landfills.

== History ==
The incinerator was built due to the shortage of land available for conventional landfills in Hong Kong. A contract to build the facility, contested by seven international companies, was awarded to Clarke Chapman-John Thompson of Gateshead, England, and signed on 29 November 1973.

An official opening ceremony for the plant was held on 17 October 1978. Unlike older incinerators in Hong Kong, the Kwai Chung plant was fitted with an electrostatic precipitator to reduce the pollution emitted. In addition, the 150-metre-tall chimney at Kwai Chung was taller than those at the Kennedy Town and Lai Chi Kok incinerators, so that pollutants would be dispersed at a higher altitude.

== Cessation of operation ==
In 1989, the Hong Kong Government issued a white paper, Pollution in Hong Kong - A Time to Act. After considering the effects of air pollution on the environment and public health, it was decided to cease using incineration to dispose of solid waste. This decision was later suspended and, as of 2008, the Hong Kong Government is considering constructing new incinerators.

In May 1997, the Kwai Chung Incineration Plant ceased to operate, the last of Hong Kong's four plants to do so:

- Lai Chi Kok Incineration Plant - commissioned 1969 and decommissioned 1991; now part of the expanded container port area
- Kennedy Town Incineration Plant - commissioned 1967 and located next to Island West Transfer Station; decommissioned 1993 and now berthing facility
- Mui Wo Incineration Plant - commissioned 1987 and decommissioned 1994; now site of Silvermine Bay Outdoor Recreation Camp

== Demolition ==
Although the plant ceased operation in 1997, it was not completely demolished. The site was found to be contaminated with dioxin, furans, asbestos, heavy metals and petroleum hydrocarbons. Special procedures were required during demolition.

Demolition of the building and 150-metre-high (490 ft) chimney was initiated in 2007.

The site cleanup preceded the demolition to clean up potential toxins and for future development of the site.

As of 2017, the Hong Kong government was considering building a public columbarium on the site.

== See also ==
- Waste management in Hong Kong
