= Airport Connector =

Airport Connector is a typical name for roads connecting major highways to airports. It may refer to:

- Airport Connector (Harrisburg), a short freeway connecting Pennsylvania Route 283 to Harrisburg International Airport
- T. F. Green Airport Connector Road, a short freeway connecting Interstate 95 to T. F. Green Airport near Warwick, Rhode Island
- Bradley Airport Connector, a freeway connecting Interstate 91 to Bradley International Airport near Hartford, Connecticut
- Harry Reid Airport Connector, a partially limited-access road designated Nevada State Route 171, connecting Harry Reid International Airport to Interstate 215 and Nevada State Route 593 (Tropicana Avenue) in Paradise, Nevada
- Hardy Airport Connector, a tolled connection from the Hardy Toll Road to George Bush Intercontinental Airport in Houston, Texas

== See also ==
- Airport Tunnel (disambiguation)
