= Airport Tunnel =

Airport Tunnel may refer to:

- Airport Tunnel (Calgary), on Airport Trail
- Airport Tunnel (Las Vegas), between Paradise Road and the Airport Connector (unsigned NV 171)
- Airport Tunnel (Los Angeles), on Sepulveda Boulevard (CA 1)
- Airport Tunnel (Montreal), unnamed tunnel on A-13
- Airport Tunnel, Hong Kong, a tunnel connecting the Hong Kong-Zhuhai-Macau Bridge Hong Kong Control Point and the Hong Kong International Airport
- Airport Tunnel, former name of the Kai Tak Tunnel in New Kowloon
- Schiphol Tunnel at Amsterdam Airport Schiphol which the Rijksweg 4 takes
- A538 road across the southern ends of both runways at Manchester Airport
