= Liu To Bridge =

Bridge in Tsing Yi, Hong Kong

Coordinates: 22.351522°N 114.09803°E

- Traditional Chinese: 寮肚橋
Transcriptions
Yue: Cantonese
- Yale Romanization: Lìuh tóuh kìuh
- Jyutping: Liu4 tou5 kiu4

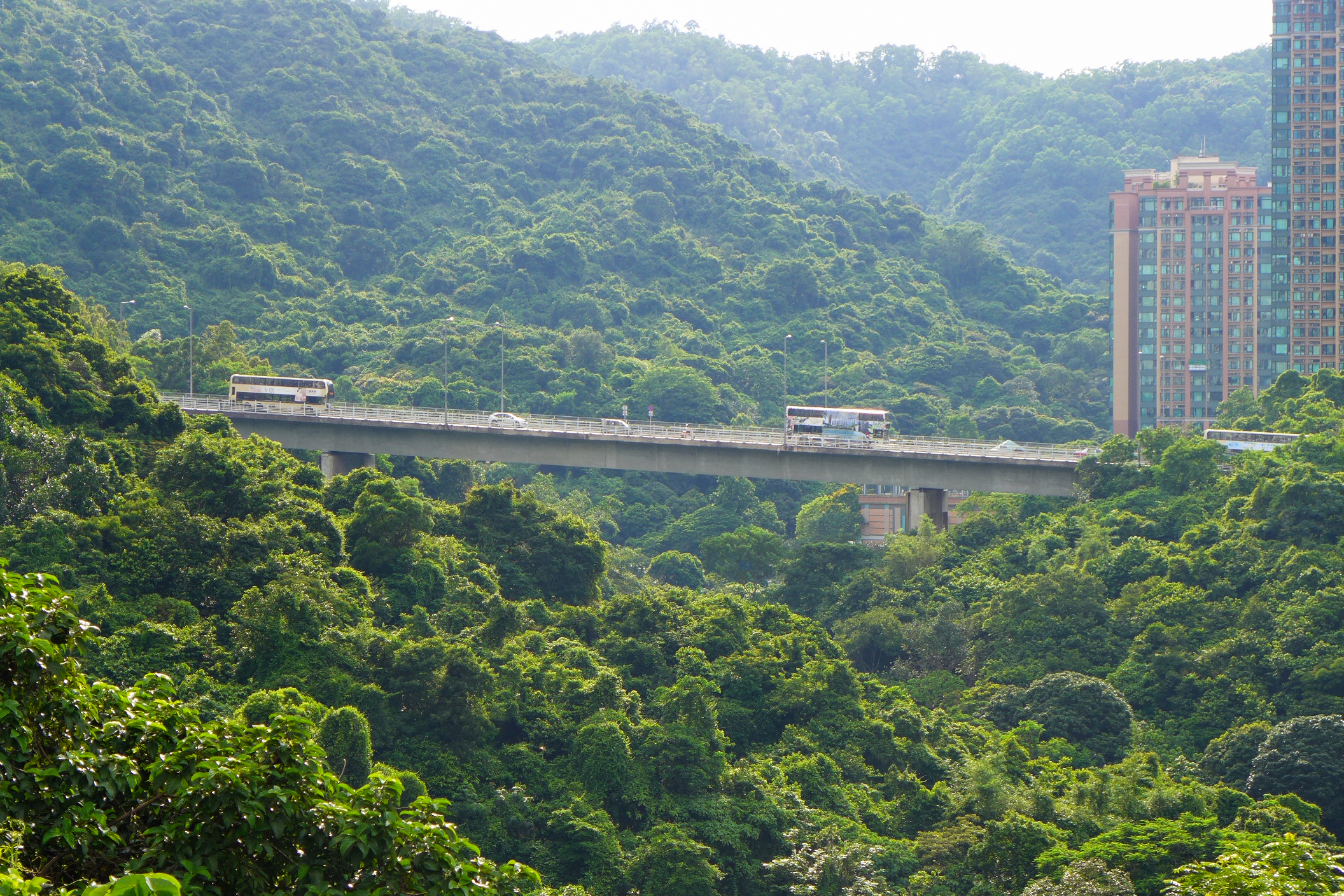
Liu To Bridge

Liu To Bridge is a bridge over the valley of Liu To, Tsing Yi Island, Hong Kong. It is part of Tsing Yi Road West. The structure is numbered N547 by Hong Kong Government.

Built between 1985 and 1987, it spans 175 m (574 ft) and is a 3-span bridge with dual 2-lane roads. As Liu To is a steep-side valley, in order to avoid temporary work on the valley floor, twin prestressed concrete boxes were stacked incrementally during the construction to provide a short section across the valley.

== See also ==
- List of tunnels and bridges in Hong Kong
- Bridges of Tsing Yi
