= Pillar Island =

Former island of Hong Kong

Coordinates: 22.3502°N 114.1166°E

- Traditional Chinese: 青洲
Transcriptions
Yue: Cantonese
- Yale Romanization: Chīng jāu
- Jyutping: Cing1 zau1

Pillar Island or Tsing Chau was an island in the Kwai Chung area of Hong Kong, sitting at the mouth of Gin Drinkers Bay, by the side of the Rambler Channel, opposite Tsing Yi Island.

In the 1960s, the bay was reclaimed and Tsing Chau became a land extension of Kwai Chung, the south of which is Kwai Tsing Container Terminals. In the early 1970s, a cross-channel bridge, Tsing Yi Bridge, was built landing on Kwai Chung where the island once was. The Kwai Chung Incineration Plant once stood on what was originally the north side of the island. It was closed and partly demolished in the early 1990s.

== See also ==
- List of islands and peninsulas of Hong Kong
- List of places in Hong Kong
