= List of typhoon shelters in Hong Kong =

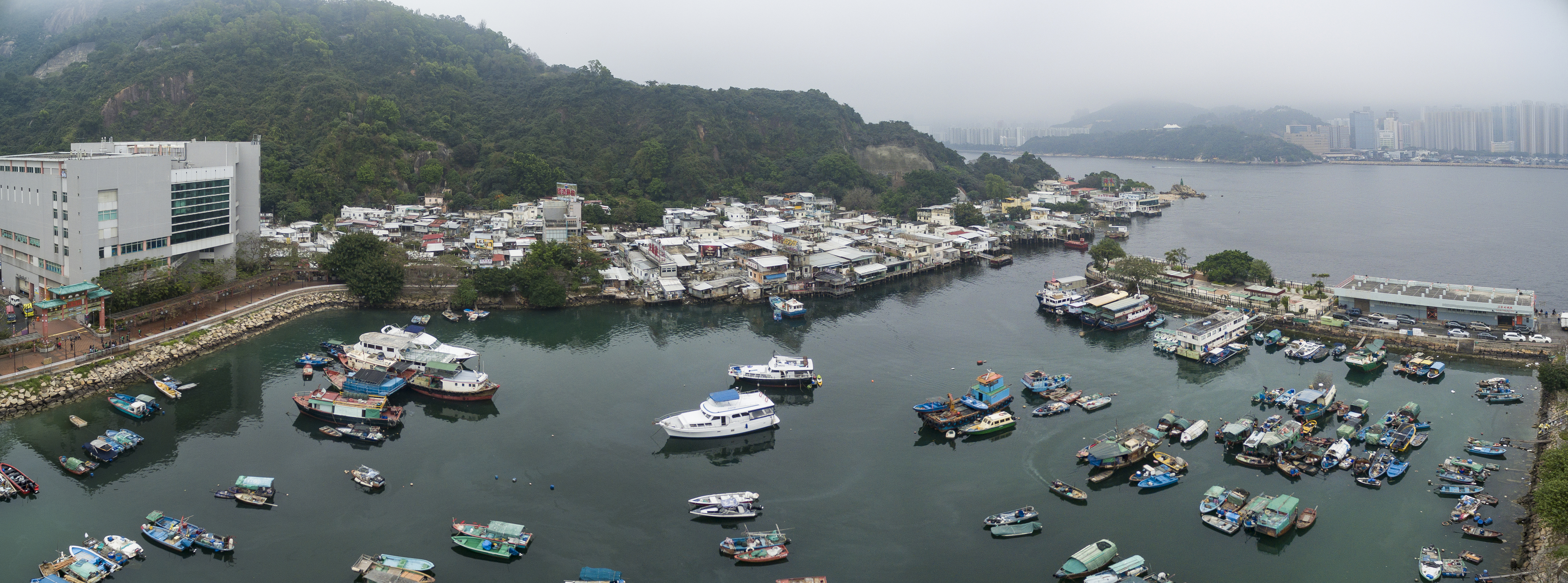
Sam Ka Tsuen Typhoon Shelter in Lei Yue Mun.

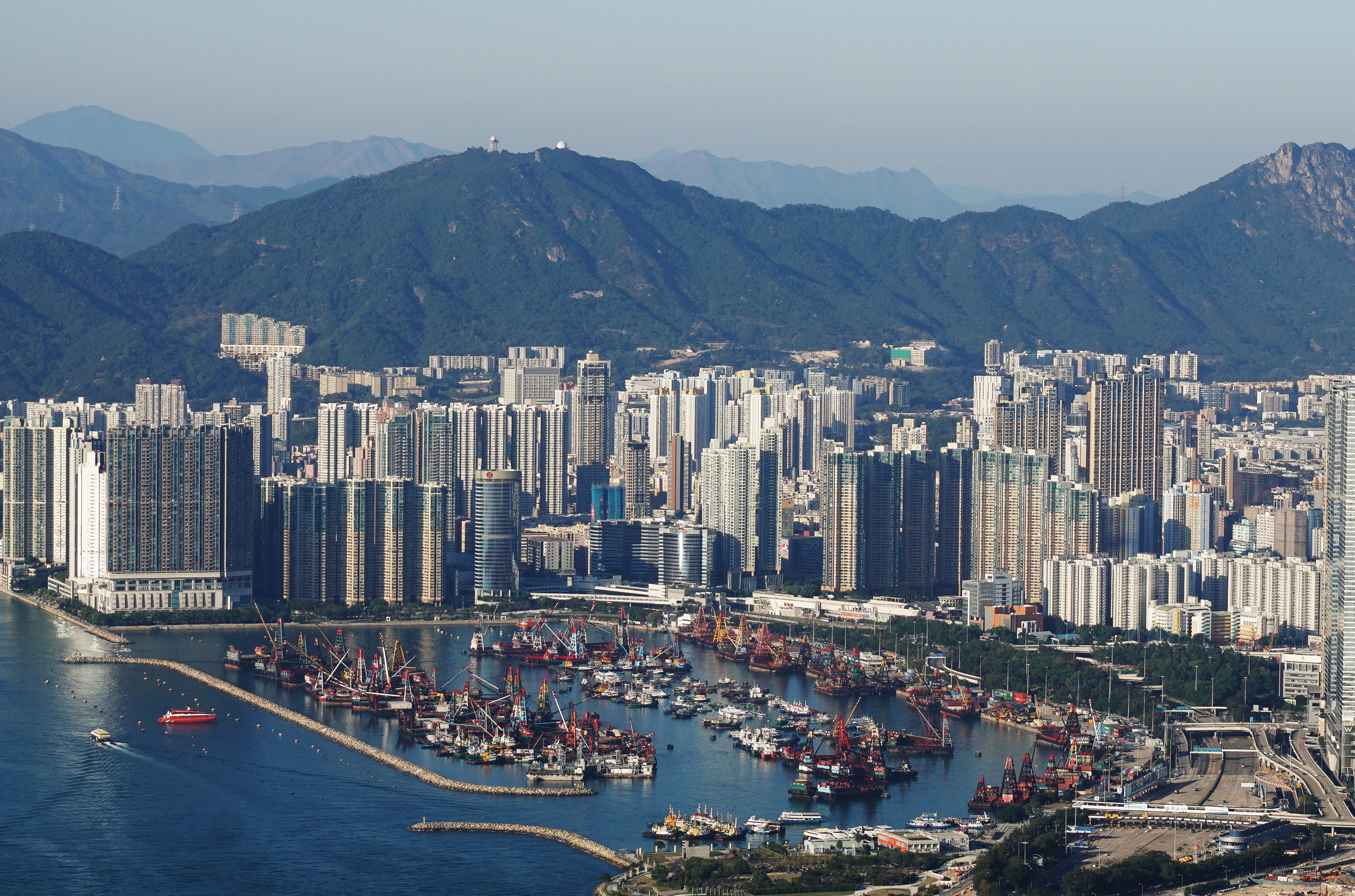
New Yau Ma Tei Typhoon Shelter

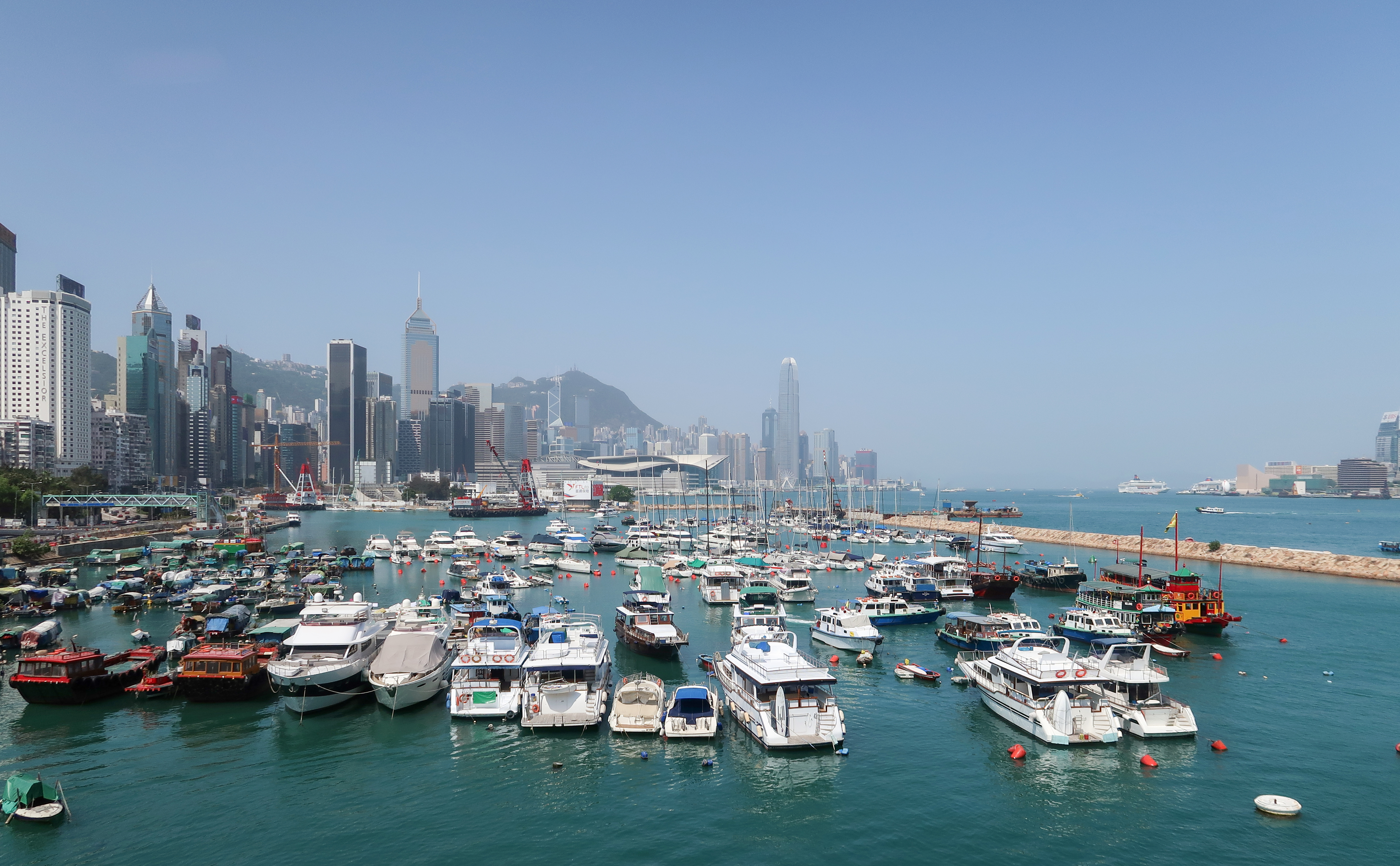
Causeway Bay Typhoon Shelter

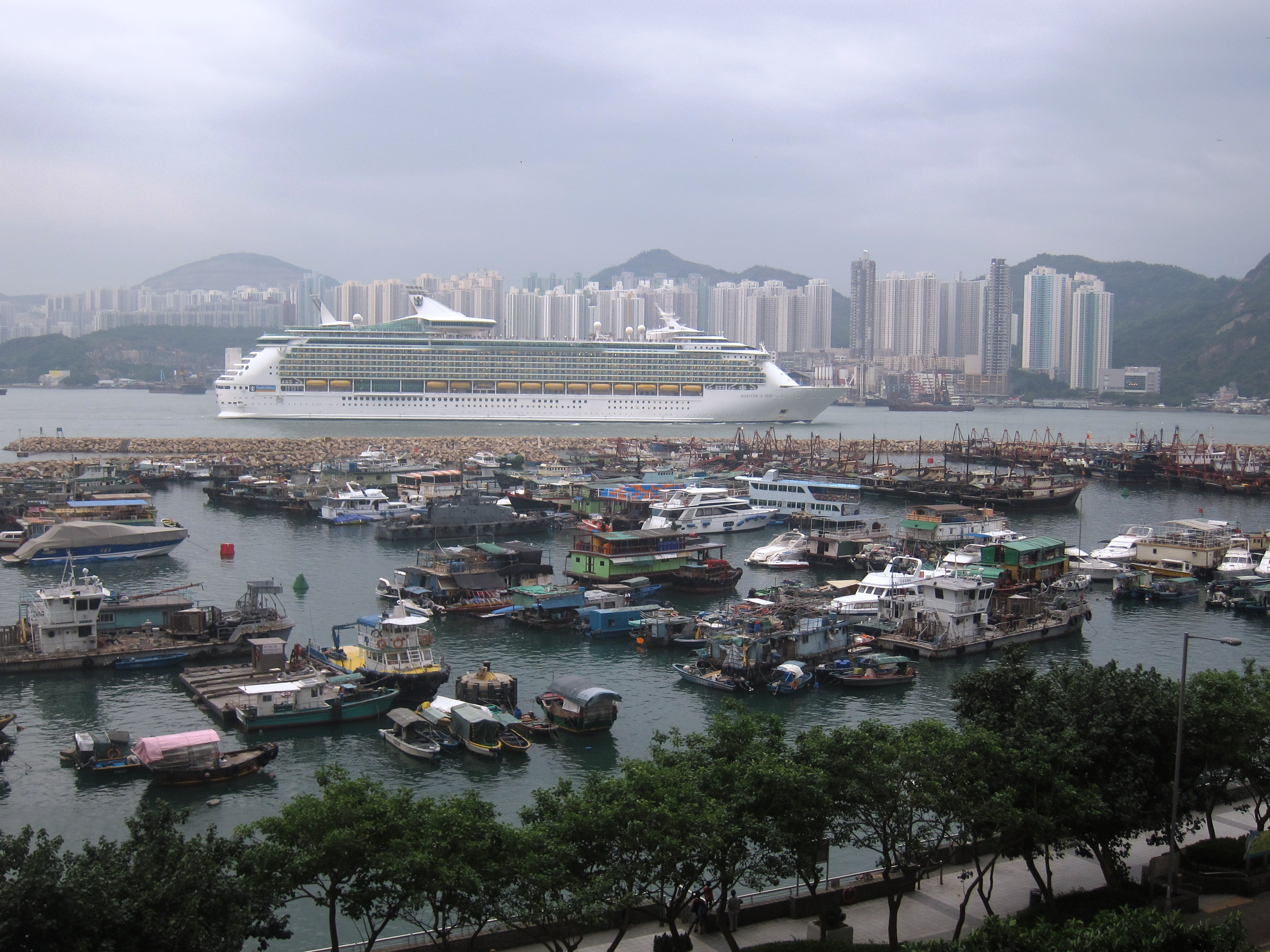
Shau Kei Wan Typhoon Shelter

The first typhoon shelter built in Hong Kong was the Causeway Bay Typhoon Shelter, completed in 1883. It was followed by the Yau Ma Tei Typhoon Shelter, inaugurated in 1915.

The following is a list of typhoon shelters in Hong Kong:

== Current ==
Name	Established	District
Aberdeen Typhoon Shelters (South/West)	1965	Southern
New Causeway Bay Typhoon Shelter	1883	Wan Chai
Cheung Chau Typhoon Shelter	1981	Islands
Hei Ling Chau Typhoon Shelter	1999	Islands
Kwun Tong Typhoon Shelter	?	Kwun Tong
New Yau Ma Tei Typhoon Shelter	1915	Yau Tsim Mong
Rambler Channel Typhoon Shelter	1966	Kwai Tsing
Sam Ka Tsuen Typhoon Shelter	1960s	Kwun Tong
Shau Kei Wan Typhoon Shelter	1992	Eastern
Shuen Wan Typhoon Shelter	1966	Tai Po
To Kwa Wan Typhoon Shelter	1993	Kowloon City
Tuen Mun Typhoon Shelter	1982	Tuen Mun
Yim Tin Tsai Typhoon Shelter	1968	Sai Kung

== Decommissioned ==
- Ngong Shuen Wan Typhoon Shelter – closed 1990s
- Chai Wan Typhoon Shelter – closed 1990s
- Yung Shue Wan Typhoon Shelter
- Wan Chai Typhoon Shelter
- Shap Long Wan Typhoon Shelter
- Shau Kei Wan Typhoon Shelter – the older one
- Causeway Bay Typhoon Shelter – reclaimed for Victoria Park
- Jordan Road Typhoon Shelter
- Yau Ma Tei Typhoon Shelter

== Sheltered anchorages ==
In addition to typhoon shelters, sheltered anchorages in Hong Kong include:

- Chai Wan Cargo Basin
- Cheung Sha Lan
- Kat O
- Middle Island
- Nim Shue Wan
- Pak Sha Wan (Hebe Haven)
- Sai Kung
- Sha Tau Kok
- Shuen Wan Hoi
- St. Stephen's Bay
- Tai Mei Tuk
- Tai O
- Tai Tam Harbour
- Ting Kau
- Tsam Chuk Wan (Jade Bay)
- Tsuen Wan
- Wan Chai Cargo Basin
- Tseung Kwan O
