= Tsing Yi South Bridge =

Bridge in New Territories, Hong Kong

Tsing Yi South Bridge 青衣南橋
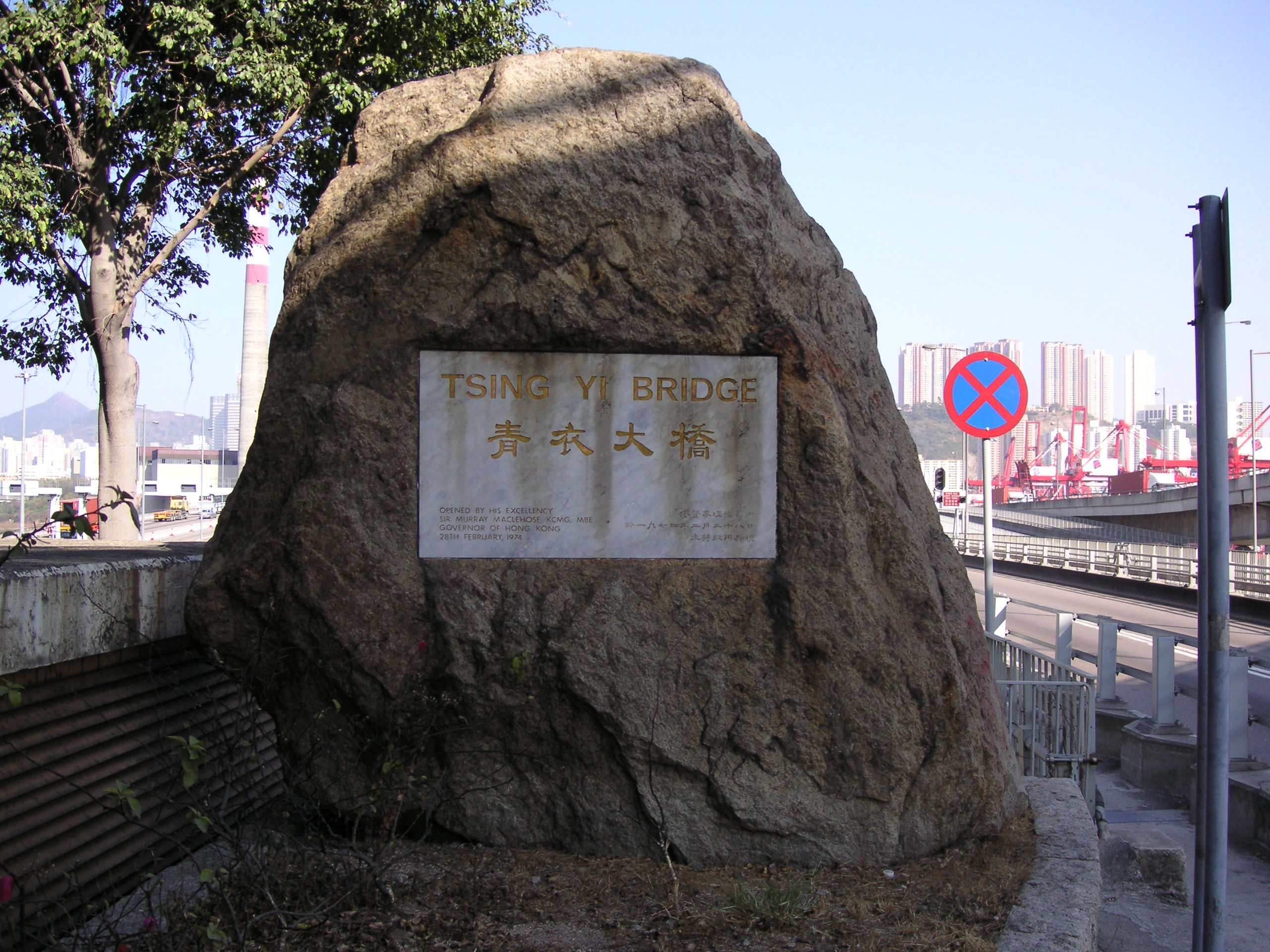
- Coordinates: 22°20′55″N 114°06′49″E
- Carries: Motor vehicles, pedestrians and cyclists
- Crosses: Rambler Channel
- Locale: New Territories, Hong Kong
- Official name: Tsing Yi South Bridge
- Other name: Tsing Yi Bridge (青衣大橋)
- Owner: Hong Kong Government

Characteristics
- No. of lanes: 2

History
- Constructed by: Gammon Construction
- Construction cost: $21 million
- Opened: 28 February 1974; 52 years ago

Location
- Interactive map of Tsing Yi South Bridge

Tsing Yi South Bridge
- Traditional Chinese: 青衣南橋
- Simplified Chinese: 青衣南桥
Transcriptions
Standard Mandarin
- Hanyu Pinyin: Qīngyī Nánqiáo
Yue: Cantonese
- Yale Romanization: Chīng yī nàahm kìuh
- Jyutping: Cing1 ji1 naam4 kiu4

Tsing Yi South Bridge (Chinese: 青衣南橋; Jyutping: cing1 ji1 naam4 kiu4), opened as the Tsing Yi Bridge (青衣大橋) on 28 February 1974, was the first bridge to Tsing Yi, Hong Kong. It spans the Rambler Channel, linking Tsing Yi Island to the former Pillar Island, Kwai Chung. The bridge spans 610 metres (about 2,000 feet) and is 26 metres (85 feet) high. It contributed significantly to the development of Tsing Yi, particularly in the 1970s and 1980s. It is the only bridge across the channel which may be used by cycles (the other bridges are either expressways or have signs prohibiting them) and so is the only route connecting Tsing Yi and the Tsuen Wan/Kwai Chung area for cyclists. The name "Tsing Yi South Bridge" was adopted following the 1987 opening of the second bridge to Tsing Yi, the Tsing Yi North Bridge.

== History ==
The bridge was built by Tsing Yi Bridge Company Limited (青衣大橋有限公司), a joint venture of six Hong Kong companies on the island, namely, China Light and Power, Hongkong Cement, International Containers, Mobil Oil, Gulf Oil, and Standard Oil. In 1970, they budgeted HK$18 million to build the bridge, while the Hong Kong Government contributed $7.5 million to the road connections.

The government granted a licence for construction of the bridge on 18 May 1971. The contractor was Gammon Construction and the engineers were W.V. Zinn and Associates.

Completed in February 1974, the bridge finally cost HK$21 million. It was opened on 28 February 1974 by Sir Murray MacLehose, the Governor of Hong Kong. Upon completion, the bridge was given to Hong Kong Government and the government built roads to link up various areas on the island. Originally, only vehicles displaying a permit issued by the Commissioner of Transport were allowed to use the bridge. Private cars were allowed free access to the bridge from 1 May 1976.

Until the 1987 opening of the Tsing Yi North Bridge, Tsing Yi Bridge was the only fixed link to mainland Hong Kong. It became notorious for traffic congestion, and when the Kwai Chung Port would close for typhoons the bridge would sometimes become blocked by lorries waiting for the port to reopen. Residents became accustomed to having to walk across the bridge when such incidents occurred.

There are two lanes on the bridge. Before the rebuilding, the bridge was two-way; afterwards, two lanes are outward bound, and the Duplicate Tsing Yi Bridge serves inward traffic.

A stone was erected on the Pillar Island end of the bridge in memory of the completion. The stone was moved to the Tsing Yi end to spare space for building the Tsing Yi Doubling Bridge.

== Connection ==
Tsing Yi Bridge is connected to Tsing Yi Road and Tsing Yi Heung Sze Wui Road on Tsing Yi Island, and Kwai Tsing Road and Tsing Kwai Highway in Kwai Chung.

== Structure ==
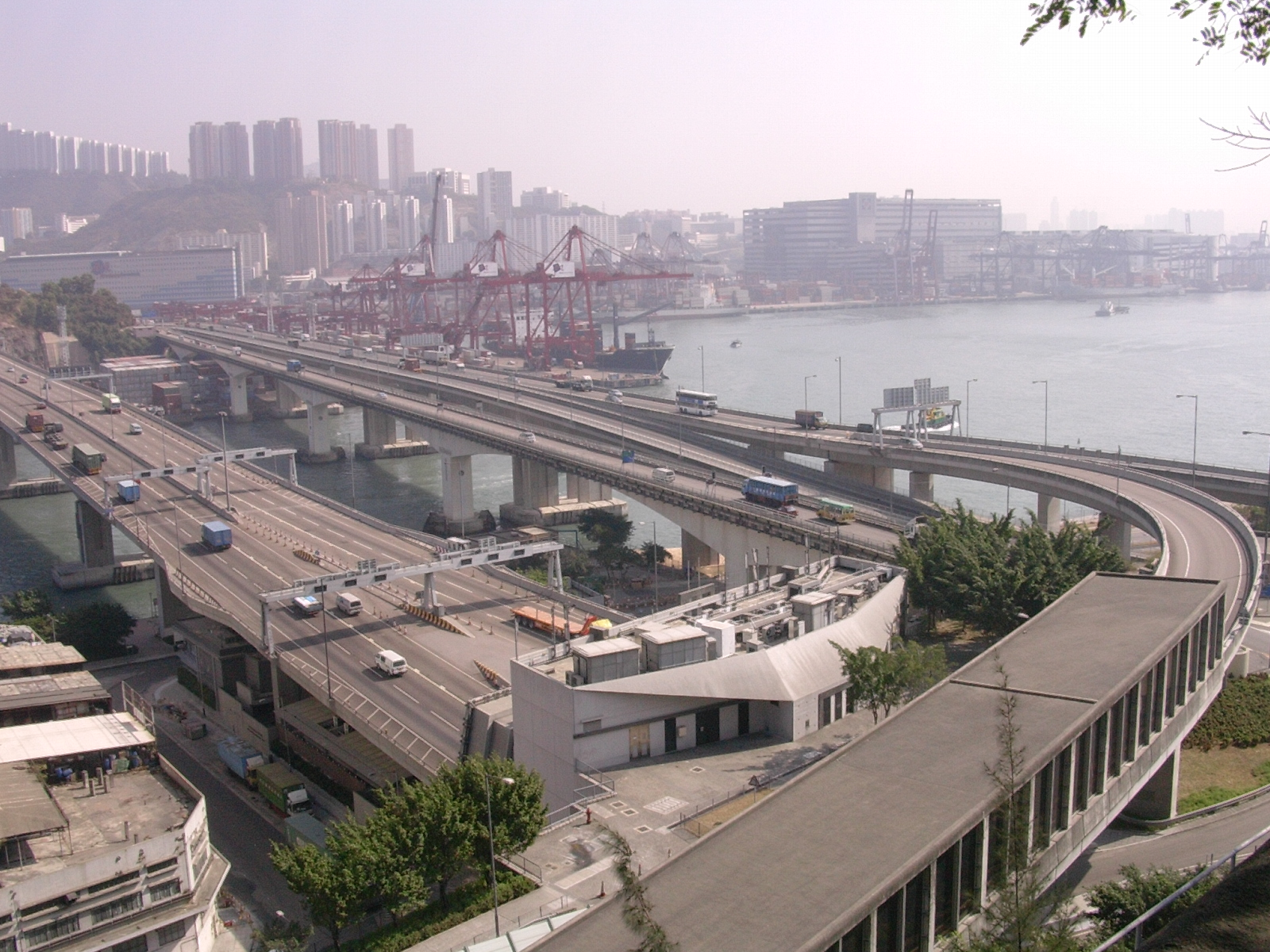
Tsing Yi Bridge (middle) and Duplicate Tsing Yi Bridge (right)

Tsing Yi Bridge is formed by 5 levers, identical pairs of arms supported by stands, 18 metres (60 feet) above the water, in the middle, with round-shaped caissons on the seabed.

The arms are made of pre-tensioned concrete. Their cross section is of hollow boxes. There are some power cables and two oil pipes inside the boxes. Both sides of hollow boxes have water pipes for the Tsing Yi Island.

On the bridge, 7 metres (24 feet) width is provided for vehicles with a 1.5 metre (5 foot) wide pedestrian walkway on each side.

The bridge is designed to withstand typhoons, strong waves and accidental collisions by ships.

== Collision ==
Ships operating in nearby water and passing through have collided with the bridge several times, and caused minor damage to the bridge. Protection islands are built on the channel to avoid further accidents. Warning signs have been erected reminding that only ships under 17 metres are allowed to sail through the channel. Ships are prohibited from staying or operating near the bridge.

== Aging and renovation ==
Tsing Yi Bridge once was the sole connection of the Tsing Yi island to the rest of Hong Kong. As residential population grew, the bridge loading was exceeded. The two lanes become a traffic bottleneck and serious traffic congestion ensued. Heavy overloading, with dramatic increases in heavy vehicle traffic, made the bridge age quickly and the gap edge bent downward. Though later Tsing Yi North Bridge was built thus alleviating the congestion a bit, and the bridge was closed once in 1989 (after the opening of the North bridge) for renovation, the safety of the bridge was still a major concern. Finally, a rescue plan was implemented. A new bridge, Duplicate Tsing Yi Bridge, was built alongside to at first to replace Tsing Yi Bridge temporarily while Tsing Yi Bridge was closed for fixing in 2000. Some tensioned steel cables replaced the aging cables inside the bridge to straighten out the bent parts. After the project completed, the Tsing Yi Bridge, together with its 'new' brother, served the island again.

== Celebration ==
On the 10th birthday of the bridge, a carnival was held on the football field, near Chan Lai So Chun Memorial School, of Cheung Ching Estate on the Tsing Yi Island.

== See also ==
Other road bridges spanning the Rambler Channel:

- Tsing Yi North Bridge (1987)
- Cheung Tsing Bridge (1997)
- Ting Kau Bridge (1998)
- Duplicate Tsing Yi Bridge (1999)
- Stonecutters Bridge (2009)
