= Duplicate Tsing Yi South Bridge =

Bridge in Hong Kong

Coordinates: 22°20′54.9″N 114°6′50.4″E

- Traditional Chinese: 青衣複制南橋
Transcriptions
Yue: Cantonese
- Yale Romanization: Chīng yī fūk jai nàahm kìuh
- Jyutping: Cing1 ji1 fuk1 zai3 naam4 kiu4

Duplicate Tsing Yi Bridge
- Traditional Chinese: 青衣複制橋
Transcriptions
Yue: Cantonese
- Yale Romanization: Chīng yī fūk jai kìuh
- Jyutping: Cing1 ji1 fuk1 zai3 kiu4

Kwai Tsing Bridge
- Traditional Chinese: 葵青橋
Transcriptions
Yue: Cantonese
- Yale Romanization: Kwàih chīng kìuh
- Jyutping: Kwai4 cing1 kiu4

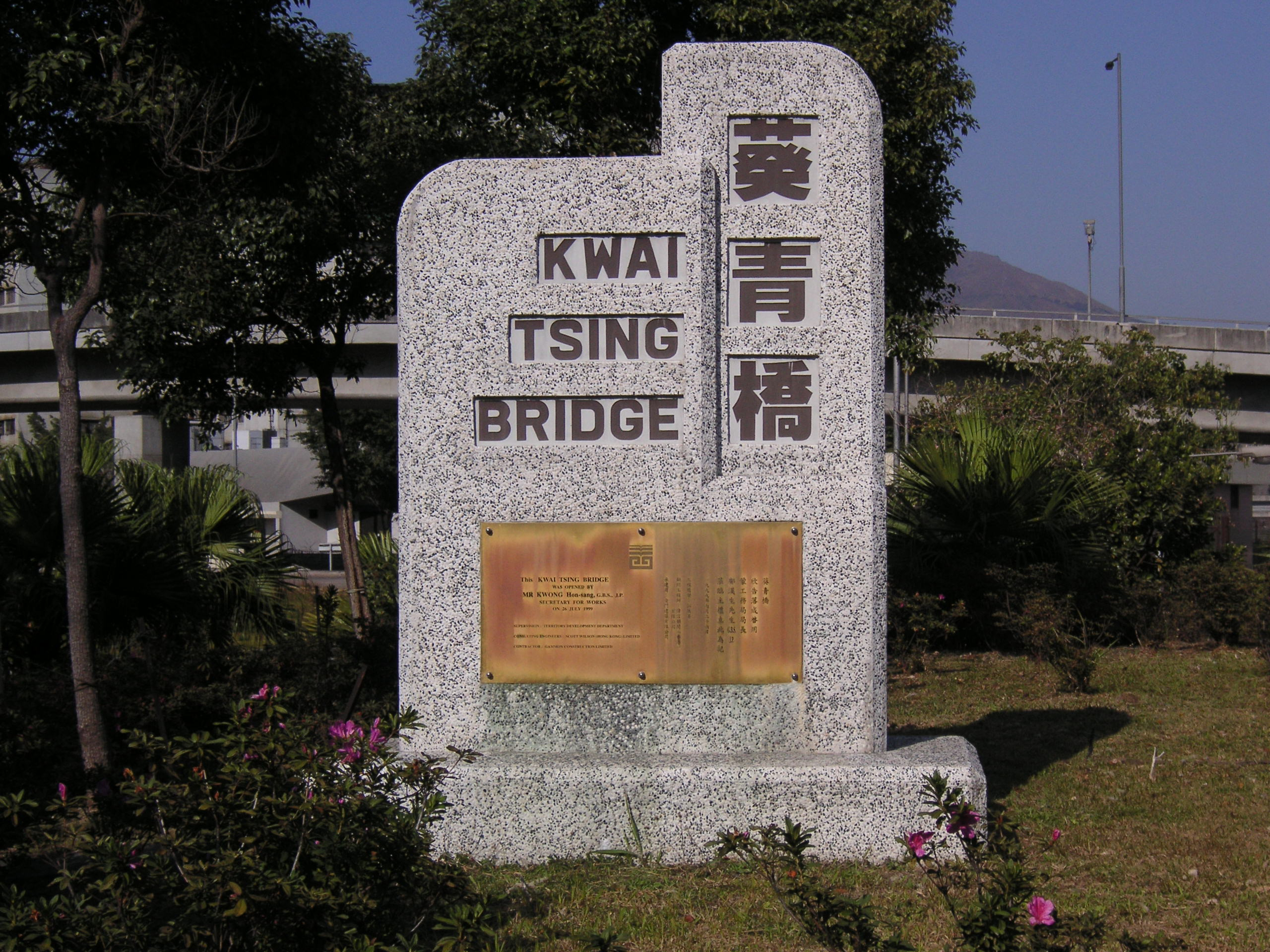
A Stone erected for the opening of Kwai Tsing Bridge (Duplicate Tsing Yi South Bridge).

Duplicate Tsing Yi South Bridge or Duplicate Tsing Yi Bridge or Kwai Tsing Bridge is a 640-metre long bridge connecting Tsing Yi Island and Kwai Chung over the Rambler Channel of Hong Kong in parallel to Tsing Yi Bridge, which deteriorated owing to years of heavy usage. The duplicated bridge was built to relieve the overburdened Tsing Yi Bridge and opened on 26 July 1999 before the commencement of Tsing Yi Bridge renovation. This is the fourth vehicular bridge connecting Kwai Chung and Tsing Yi.

The duplicated bridge piers are aligned with those of Tsing Yi Bridge to retain the navigation channel. Two artificial islands with lights are created to protect the bridges against accidental damage by ships, which happened to the Tsing Yi Bridge several times.

The connecting roads and ramps are restructured on both the Tsing Yi Island side and the Kwai Chung side. These improvements have freed the bridges from traffic congestion, which occurred frequently in the past.

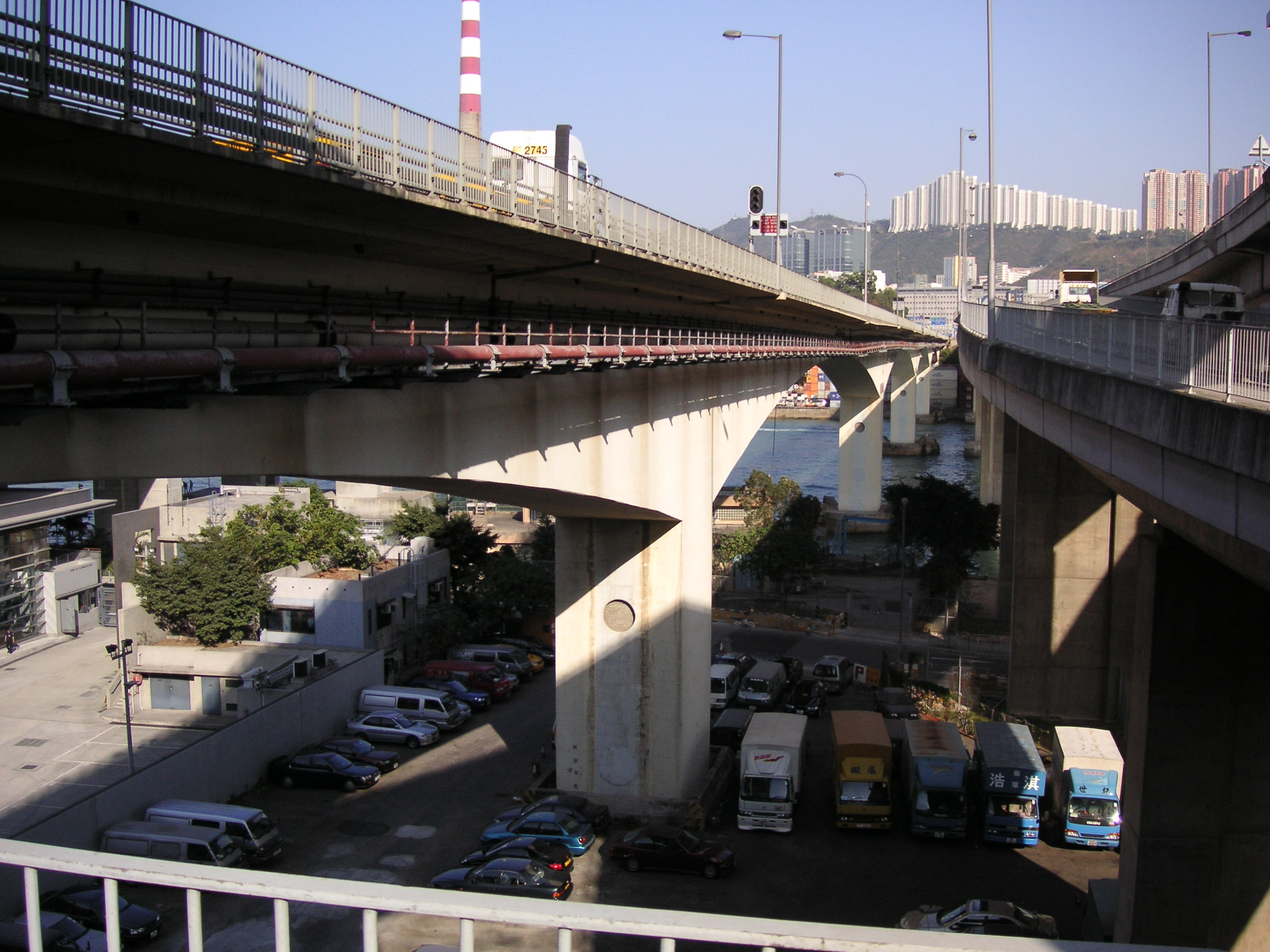
Tsing Yi Bridge (left) and Duplicate Tsing Yi Bridge (right)
