= Lion Rock Tunnel (Tuen Ma line) =

Hong Kong rail underpass

Coordinates: 22.3527°N 114.1764°E

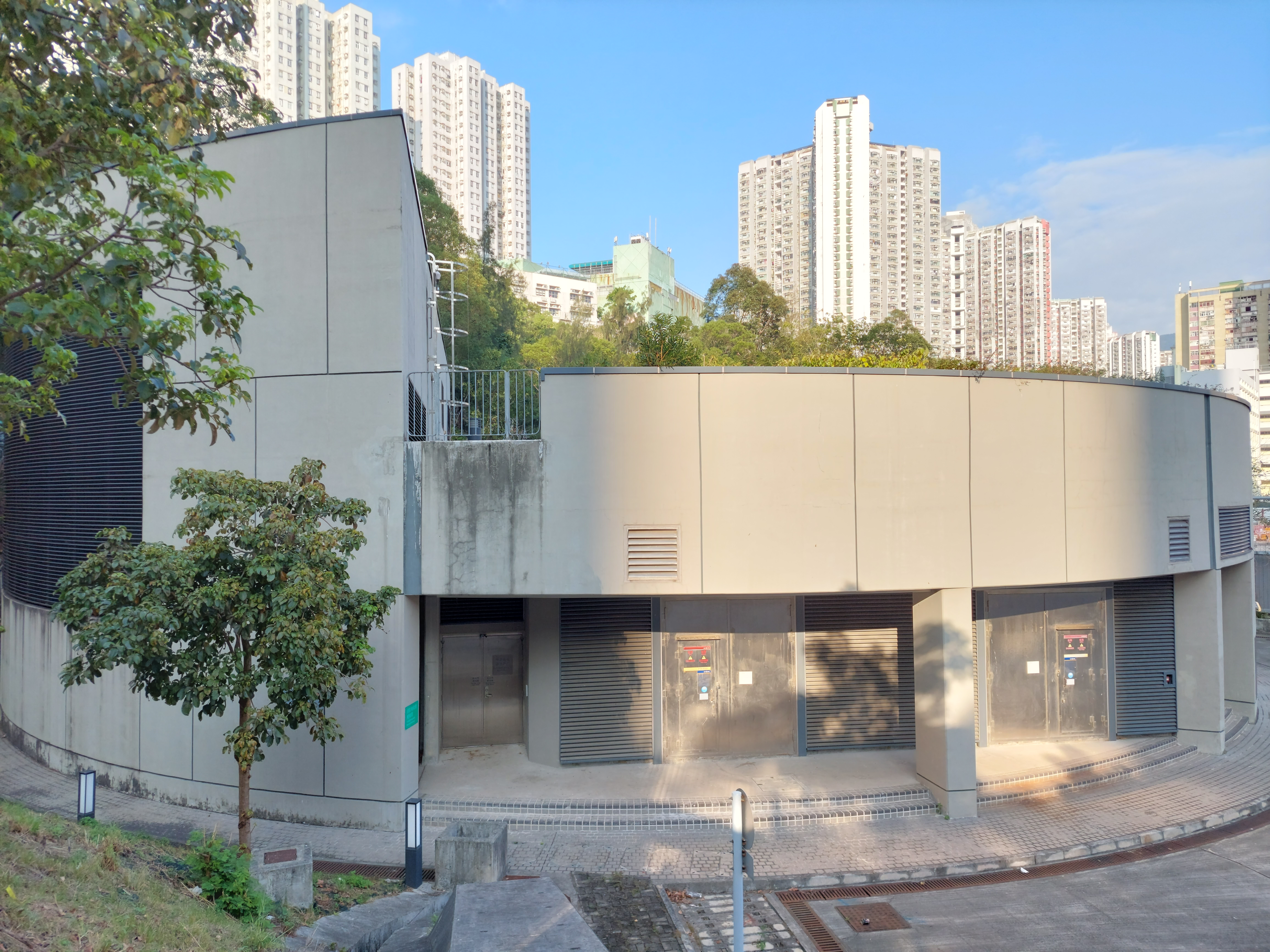
Ma Chai Hang Ventilation Building (馬仔坑通風樓).

The Lion Rock Tunnel (Chinese: 獅子山隧道) on the MTR Tuen Ma line is a 2.475 kilometres (1.538 mi) transport tunnel in Hong Kong. It was opened on 14 February 2020.

The tunnel is located between Hin Keng station and Diamond Hill station.

This tunnel can pass through Lion Rock Country Park.
