= Tsing Yi North Bridge =

Bridge in New Territories, Hong Kong

Tsing Yi North Bridge 青衣北橋
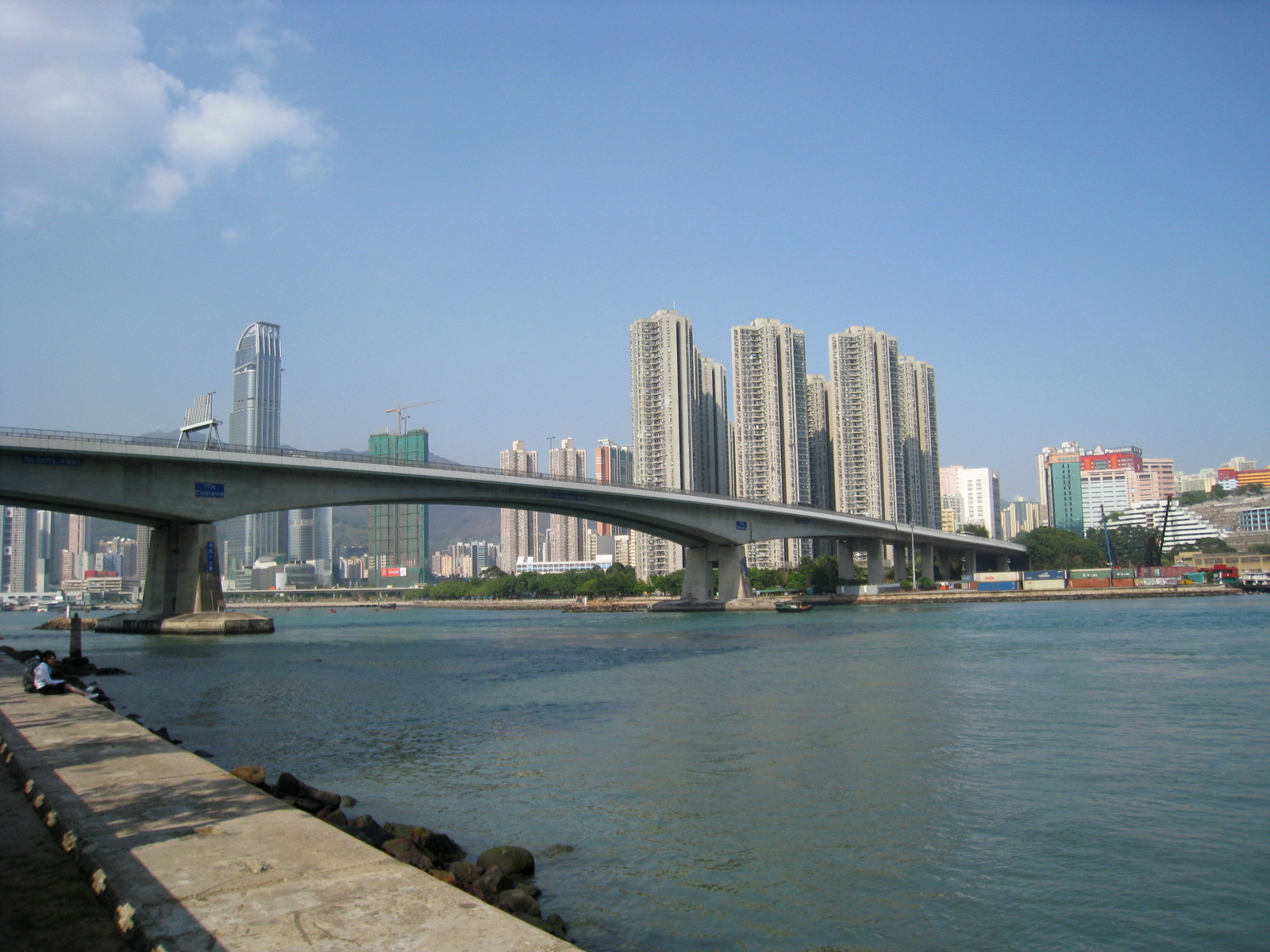
- View of Tsing Yi North Bridge from south
- Coordinates: 22°21′36″N 114°6′37″E
- Carries: Motor vehicles, pedestrians
- Crosses: Rambler Channel
- Locale: Kwai Tsing District; Hong Kong
- Owner: Hong Kong Government
- Maintained by: Highways Department

Characteristics
- Total length: 1,015 metres
- Longest span: 160 metres
- Piers in water: 2

History
- Designer: Scott Wilson Kirkpatrick and Partners
- Constructed by: Maeda/Oriental Joint Venture
- Construction start: 24 September 1984; 42 years ago
- Construction cost: HK$200 million
- Opened: 11 December 1987; 38 years ago
- Inaugurated: 10 December 1987; 38 years ago

Statistics
- Daily traffic: 41,680 (2016)

Location
- Interactive map of Tsing Yi North Bridge

Tsing Yi North Bridge (Chinese: 青衣北橋), also called Tsing Tsuen Bridge (青荃橋), connects the Tam Kon Shan Interchange on Tsing Yi Island to the Tsuen Tsing Interchange in Tsuen Wan, spanning the Rambler Channel. Inaugurated on 10 December 1987, the bridge was designed to improve access to Tsing Yi, which at that time was connected to Kwai Chung by only one fixed link, the heavily congested Tsing Yi Bridge.

== History ==
The Tsing Yi North Bridge was intended to alleviate congestion on Tsing Yi's sole existing bridge to the south. It was designed by Scott Wilson Kirkpatrick and Partners and constructed by the Maeda/Oriental Joint Venture. Construction began on 24 September 1984.

An opening ceremony for the Tsing Yi North Bridge, built at a cost of HK$200 million, was held by Governor David Wilson on 10 December 1987. It opened to traffic on 11 December 1987, at which time it was the longest bridge in Hong Kong.

The ferry service between Tsing Yi and Tsuen Wan was terminated by Hongkong and Yaumati Ferry several years after the opening of the North Bridge.

== Structure ==
Tsing Yi North Bridge was, when opened in 1987, Hong Kong's largest prestressed balanced cantilever bridge with a main navigation span of 160 metres, side spans of 90 metres, and approach viaducts that brought the total length to 1,015 metres. The design can support a 2-way and 4-lane traffic. The balustrade on the bridge was an aluminium-type to prevent rusting, although it was changed to welded stainless steel, because of the frequent stolen cases of aluminium bars in the past decades.

== Extension ==
On 1 February 2002, the day of the opening of Tsing Yi North Coastal Road, the North Bridge was connected and became the main path from Tsuen Wan to Tung Chung on Lantau Island and the International Airport in Chek Lap Kok.
