= Rambler Channel =

Sea channel in Hong Kong

Coordinates: 22°21′56″N 114°5′59″E

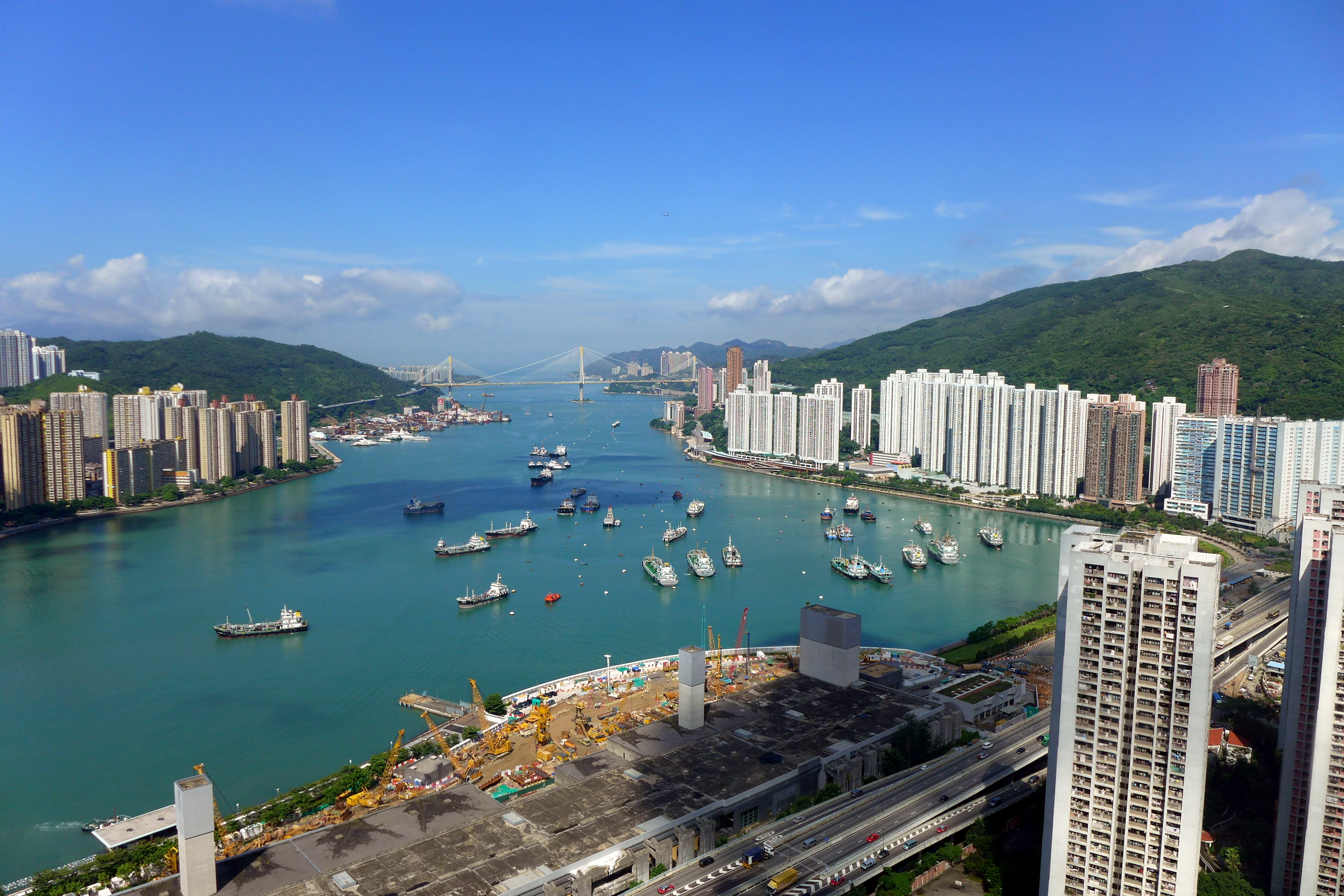
- Over Rambler Channel in August 2014
- Traditional Chinese: 藍巴勒海峽
- Simplified Chinese: 蓝巴勒海峡
Transcriptions
Standard Mandarin
- Hanyu Pinyin: Lánbālè Hǎixiá
Hakka
- Romanization: lam^{2} ba^{1} let^{6} hoi^{3} hiap^{3}
Yue: Cantonese
- Jyutping: laam^{4} baa^{1} laak^{6} hoi^{2} haap^{3}

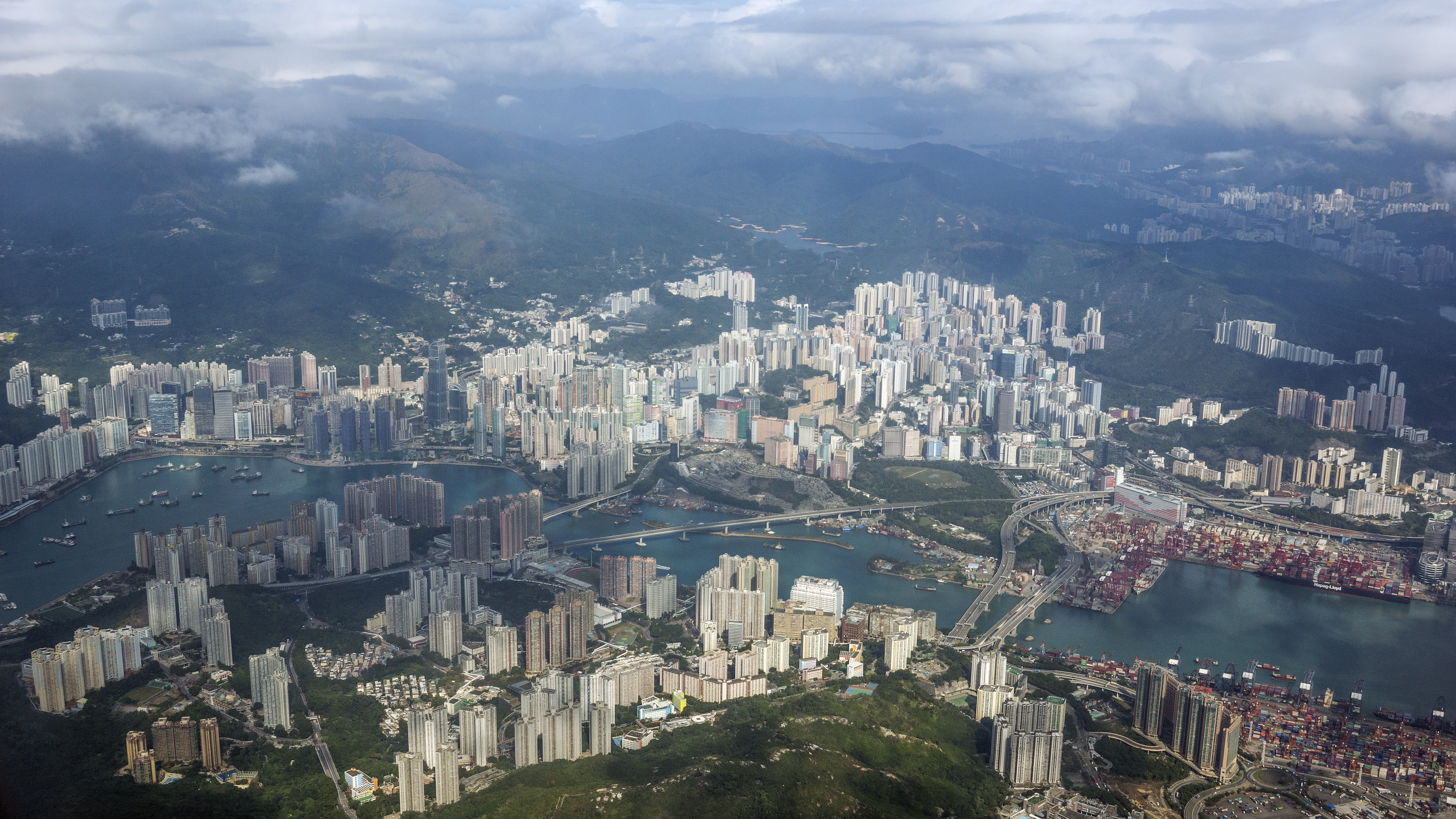
Rambler Channel in November 2017

Rambler Channel is a body of water in Hong Kong that separates Tsing Yi Island from Tsuen Wan and Kwai Chung in the New Territories. The channel separates the two landmasses by 900 metres at its widest point.

Historically, the channel was known as Tsing Yi Mun (青衣門) and Tsing Yi Channel (青衣海峽). The current name of the channel likely originates from HMS Rambler, one of the naval survey ships which charted the waters of this area.

The shoreline of the channel has changed rapidly in the last several decades, owing to the development of Tsuen Wan New Town and the Kwai Chung Container Port. Before extensive reclamation, Gin Drinkers Bay was located along the eastern shore of the channel, and Tsing Yi Bay was located along the western shore. Three islands (Nga Ying Chau, Pillar Island and Mong Chau) once stood in the channel as well.

== Port facilities ==
- Kwai Tsing Container Terminals

== Transport ==
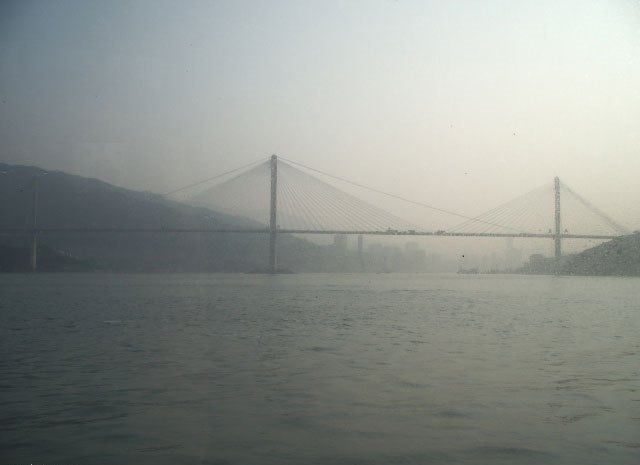
Ting Kau Bridge, early morning in October 2004. Underneath is the Rambler Channel.

Six road bridges and one rail bridge span the channel:

- Ting Kau Bridge, connecting Tsing Yi Island with Tuen Mun Road and Tai Lam Tunnel
- Tsing Tsuen Bridge, usually known as the Tsing Yi North Bridge
- Tsing Lai Bridge, the sole railway bridge, used by the MTR metro system
- Cheung Tsing Bridge, part of Tsing Kwai Highway (Route 3), leading to Cheung Tsing Tunnel
- Tsing Yi Bridge, usually known as the Tsing Yi South Bridge
- Kwai Tsing Bridge, usually known as the second Tsing Yi South Bridge
- Stonecutters Bridge, connecting Tsing Yi Island with Stonecutters Island

=== Ferry piers ===
- Tsuen Wan Ferry Pier (demolished for Tsuen Wan West station)
- Tsing Yi Ferry Pier (ferry services to this pier have ceased)

== See also ==
- Rambler Channel Typhoon Shelter
