= Typhoon shelter =

Type of harbour protecting against typhoons

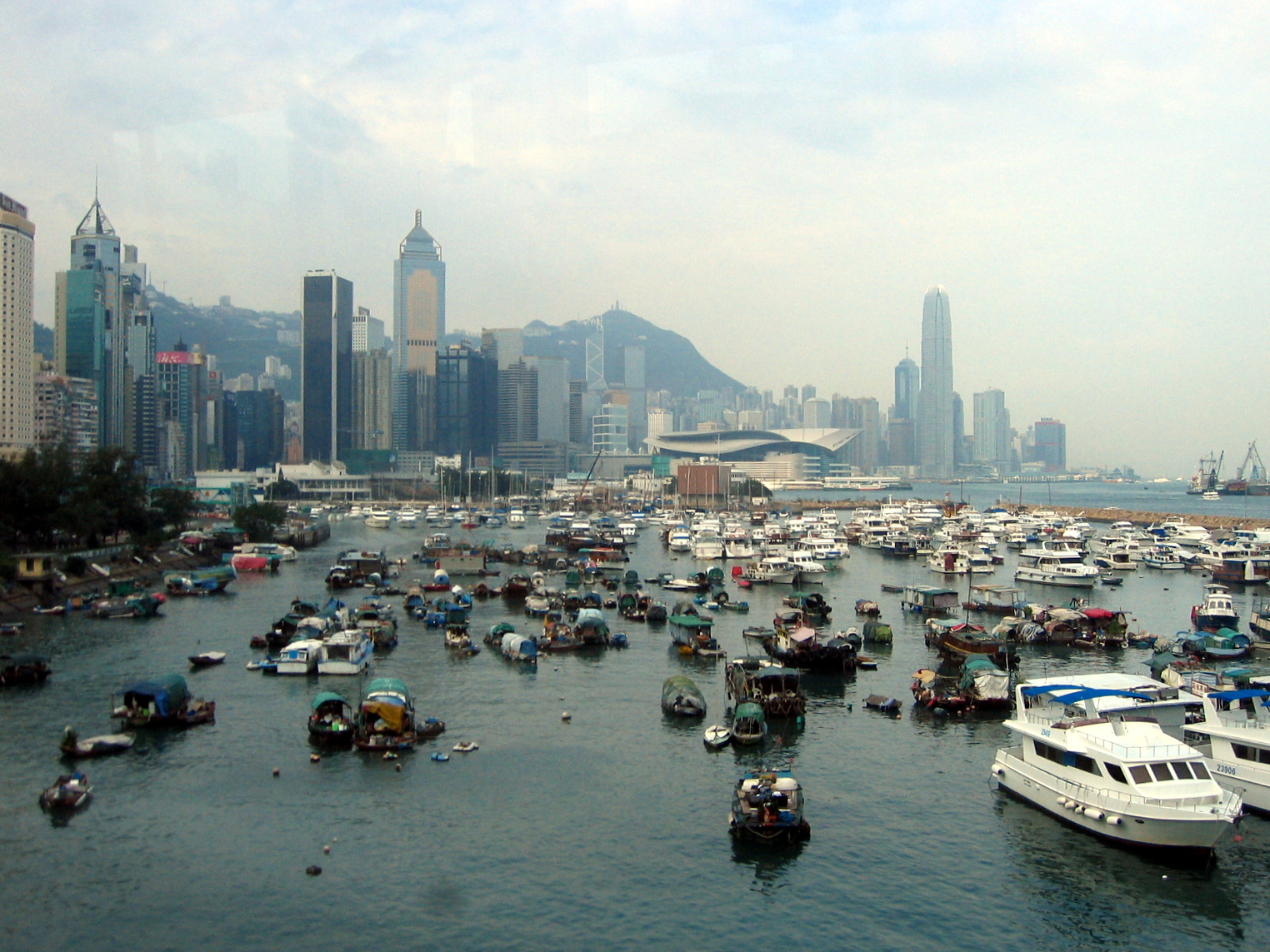
Causeway Bay Typhoon Shelter.

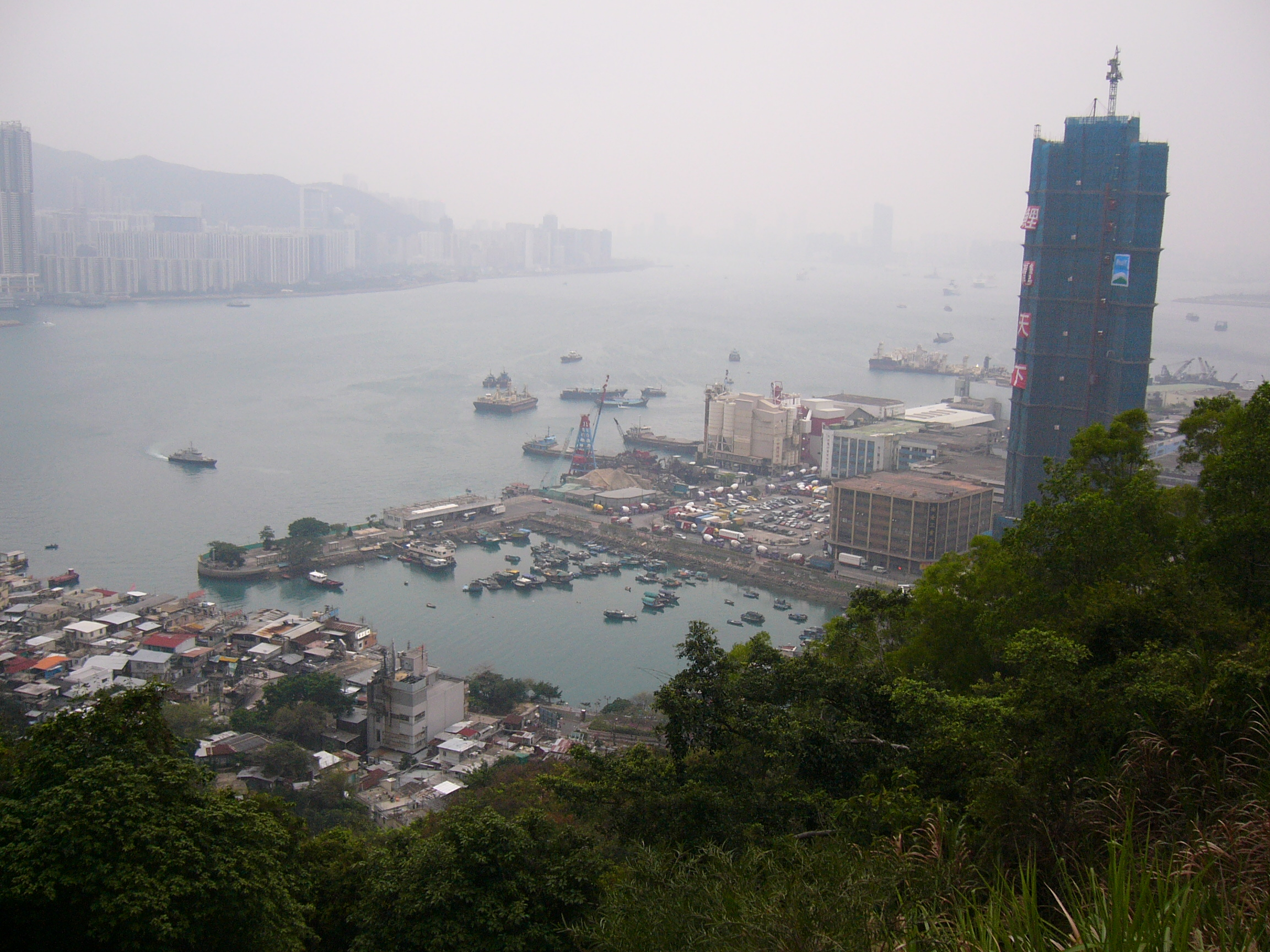
Sam Ka Tsuen Typhoon Shelter.

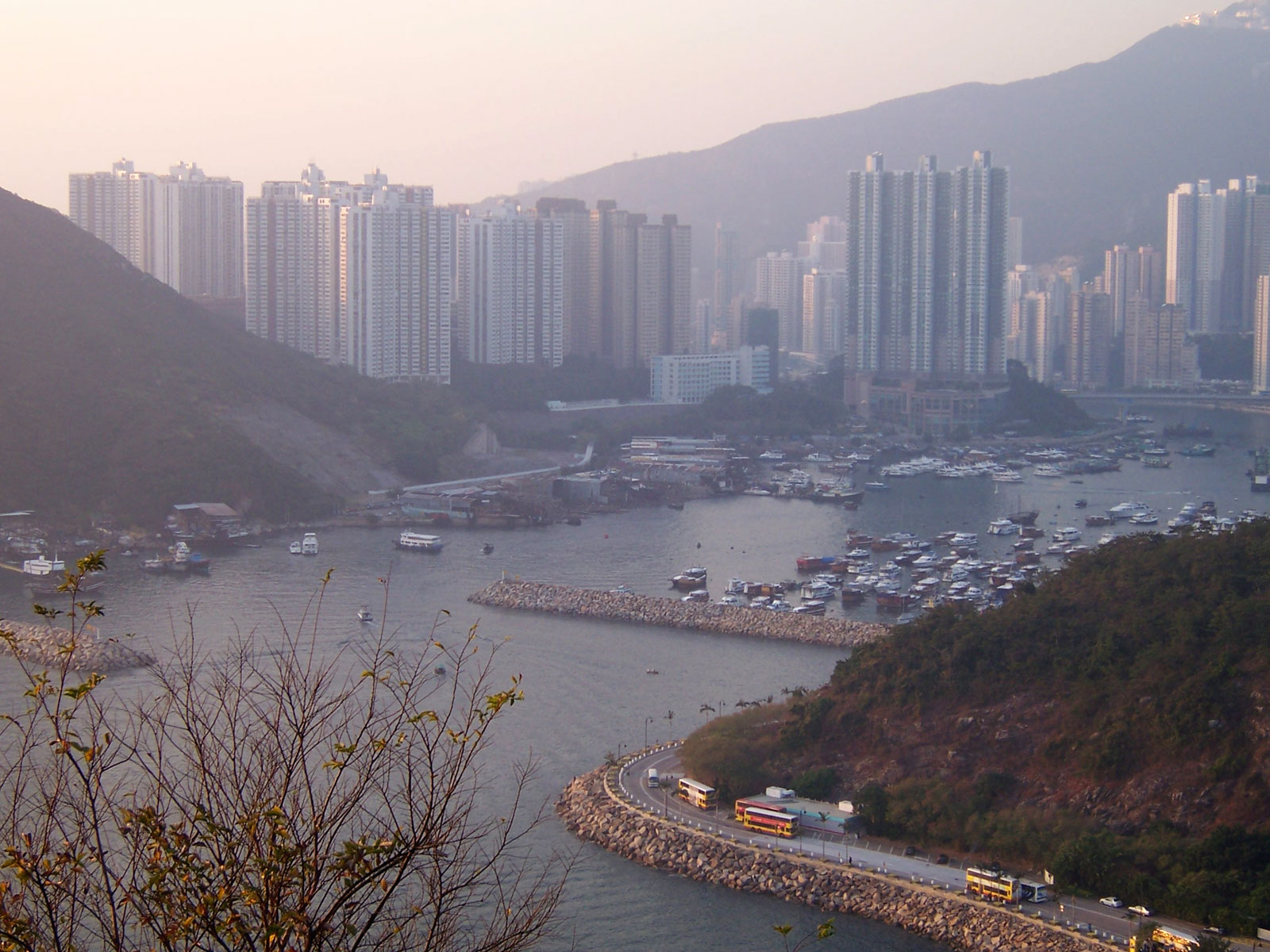
Aberdeen South Typhoon Shelter.

A typhoon shelter (Chinese: 避風塘) is a shelter for fishing boats during typhoons. These facilities are often found in Hong Kong.

== Structure ==
In its usual form, a typhoon shelter is in the form of a bay or a cove, with a narrow opening for access, as most of the opening to the seas is blocked by a man-made breakwater.

== Usage ==
A typhoon shelter, as its name suggests, is used by small to medium ships as a shelter against gale-force winds and rough seas during a typhoon strike. It is also used to moor yachts (the shelter in Causeway Bay in Hong Kong is often used for that purpose) and some typhoon shelters have wharves for cargo.

== Life in typhoon shelters ==
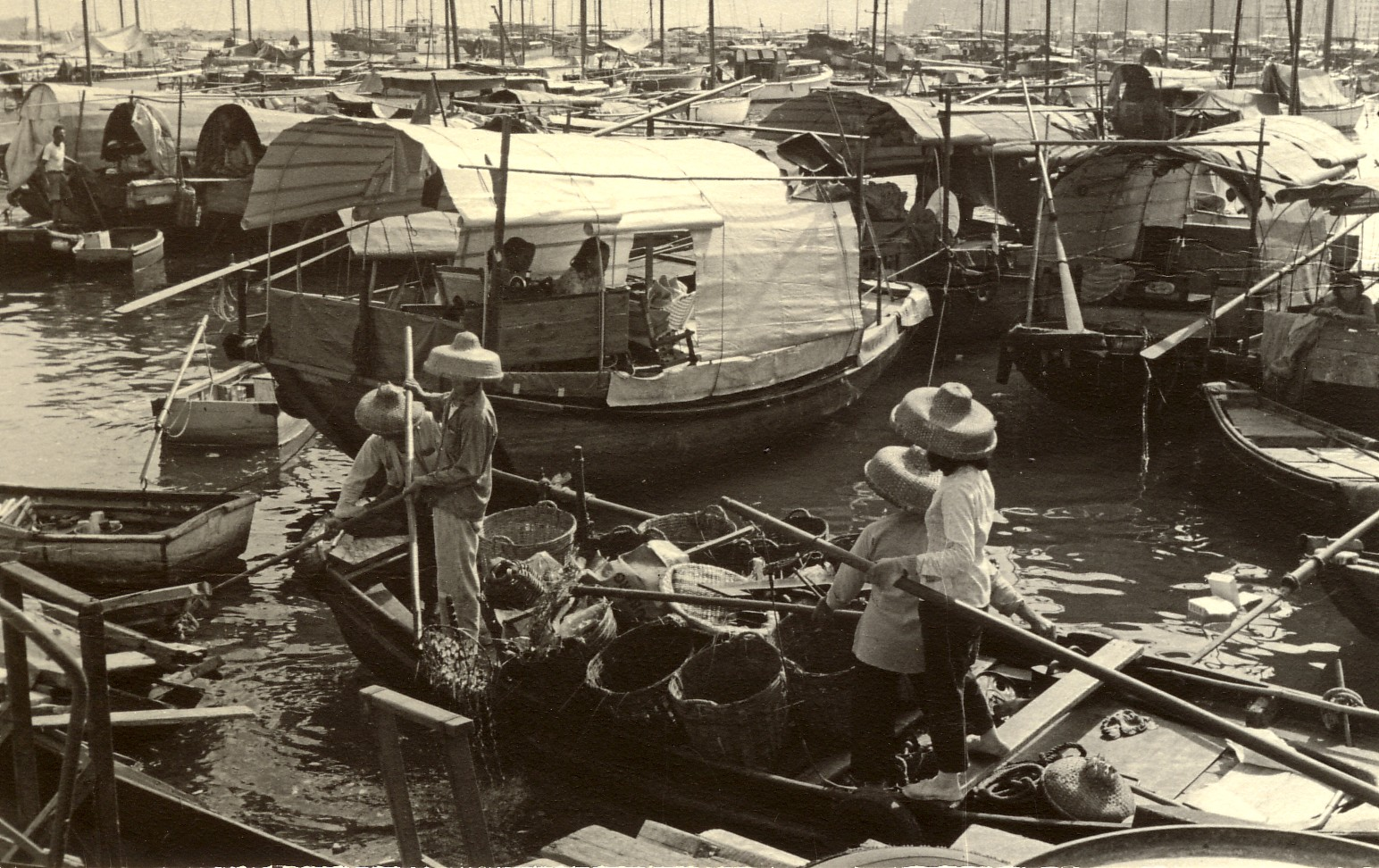
Sampan village in 1965 Hong Kong.

Before the 1990s, there was a fairly large population living on boats in typhoon shelters. Many of them were the descendants of fishermen or boat people. They developed a distinct culture that is different from the mainstream cultures found in Hong Kong. The culture is, by many definitions, a fully developed one, with its own language, wedding rituals and other things such as food, songs and superstitions.

The life and culture of the descendants of these fishermen has often been glamourised, and effectively hid the truth of the extreme poverty that existed among these people. Since they often had to go out to sea to fish, the children of a fisherman's family often did not go to school. This created the need for "floating schools", operated by religious organisations, to educate children living in typhoon shelters. Also, as the catch was variable income was not steady.

Finally, as it is impossible to establish proper plumbing and garbage collection services among these boats, sanitary conditions in typhoon shelters during the time there were many people living there were less than desirable.

== Typhoon shelter crab ==
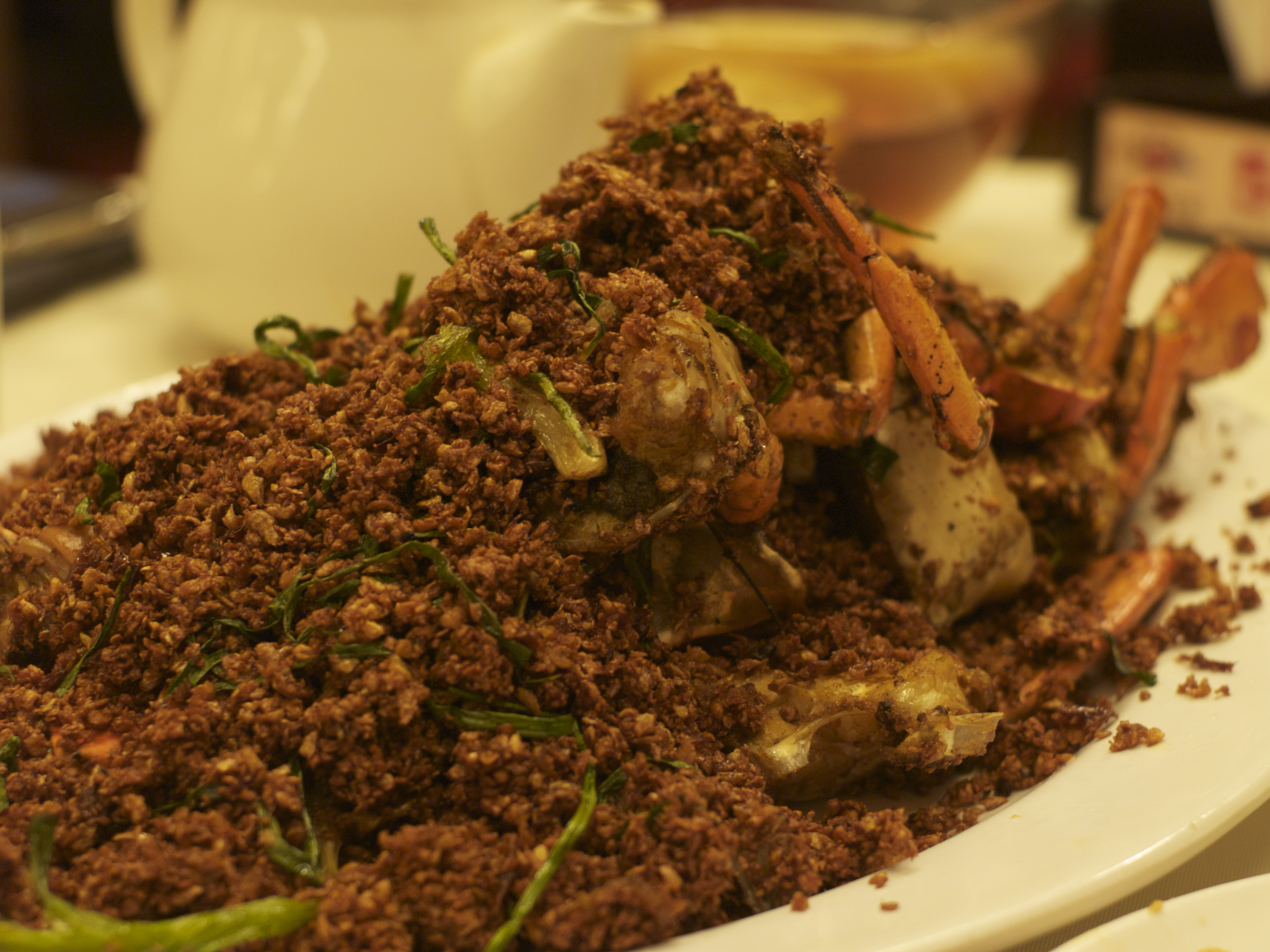
Typhoon shelter crab

Typhoon shelter crab (Chinese: 避風塘炒蟹), a dish served in many Hong Kong Chinese restaurants, is believed to have originated from the typhoon shelters. It is commonly prepared with crab meat, garlic, scallion, red chili and black beans.

== Typhoon shelter prawn ==
Besides typhoon shelter crab, which is very well known throughout the world, the typhoon shelter style is also often cooked with prawn (Chinese: 避風塘炒蝦), especially giant tiger prawns (Penaeus monodon) or mantis prawn (Mantis shrimp). The method of cooking is similar to cooking typhoon shelter crab, where prawns are deep fried in aromatic oil, stir-fried with garlic, ginger, shallots, dried chili and black bean.

== Present ==
Hong Kong's status as a fishing city continues to decline; the descendants of the fishermen have moved onshore, and the so-called "Typhoon Shelter" culture is rapidly being lost. The function of typhoon shelters remains unchanged, however, and their existence is still vital to Hong Kong.

Some restaurants serving typhoon shelter-style cuisine have moved to shops onshore.

== See also ==
- Harbor
- List of typhoon shelters in Hong Kong
- Cuisine of Hong Kong
