= Airport Tunnel, Hong Kong =

Airport Tunnel 機場隧道
- Interactive map of Airport Tunnel 機場隧道

Overview
- Location: Chek Lap Kok
- Coordinates: 22°18′8″N 114°56′14″E
- Status: Active
- Start: Tung Wing Road
- End: Airport Road

Operation
- Constructed: 31 May 2012; 14 years ago
- Opened: 24 October 2018; 7 years ago
- Owner: Hong Kong Government
- Traffic: Vehicular
- Toll: No

Technical
- Length: 0.6 kilometres (0.37 mi)
- No. of lanes: 2 lanes (one-way)
- Operating speed: 50 kilometres per hour (31 mph)

Airport Tunnel, Hong Kong
- Chinese: 機場隧道
- Jyutping: gei1 coeng4 seoi6 dou6
- Literal meaning: Airport Tunnel
Transcriptions
Standard Mandarin
- Hanyu Pinyin: jī cháng suì dào
Yue: Cantonese
- Jyutping: gei1 coeng4 seoi6 dou6

Airport Tunnel is a road tunnel located in Chek Lap Kok, Lantau Island, Hong Kong, which connects Hong Kong–Zhuhai–Macau Bridge Hong Kong Port with Hong Kong International Airport.

This is one of the two tunnels constructed in Hong Kong–Zhuhai–Macau Bridge Hong Kong Link Road project, with the other one being Scenic Hill Tunnel.
