= Tai Ho =

Tai Ho may refer to:

- Tai Ho (大蠔), also known as Tai Ho Wan (大蠔灣), a place on Lantau Island, Hong Kong
- Tai Ho Village (大蠔村), a village in the Tai Ho Wan area
- Tai Ho Hall (Tai Ho Tien), a historic romanization of the Hall of Supreme Harmony in Beijing, China
- Tai Ho, a recurring character in Suikoden

== See also ==
- Tai Hau Wan (disambiguation)
