= Cheung Tung Road =

Major road on Lantau Island, Hong Kong

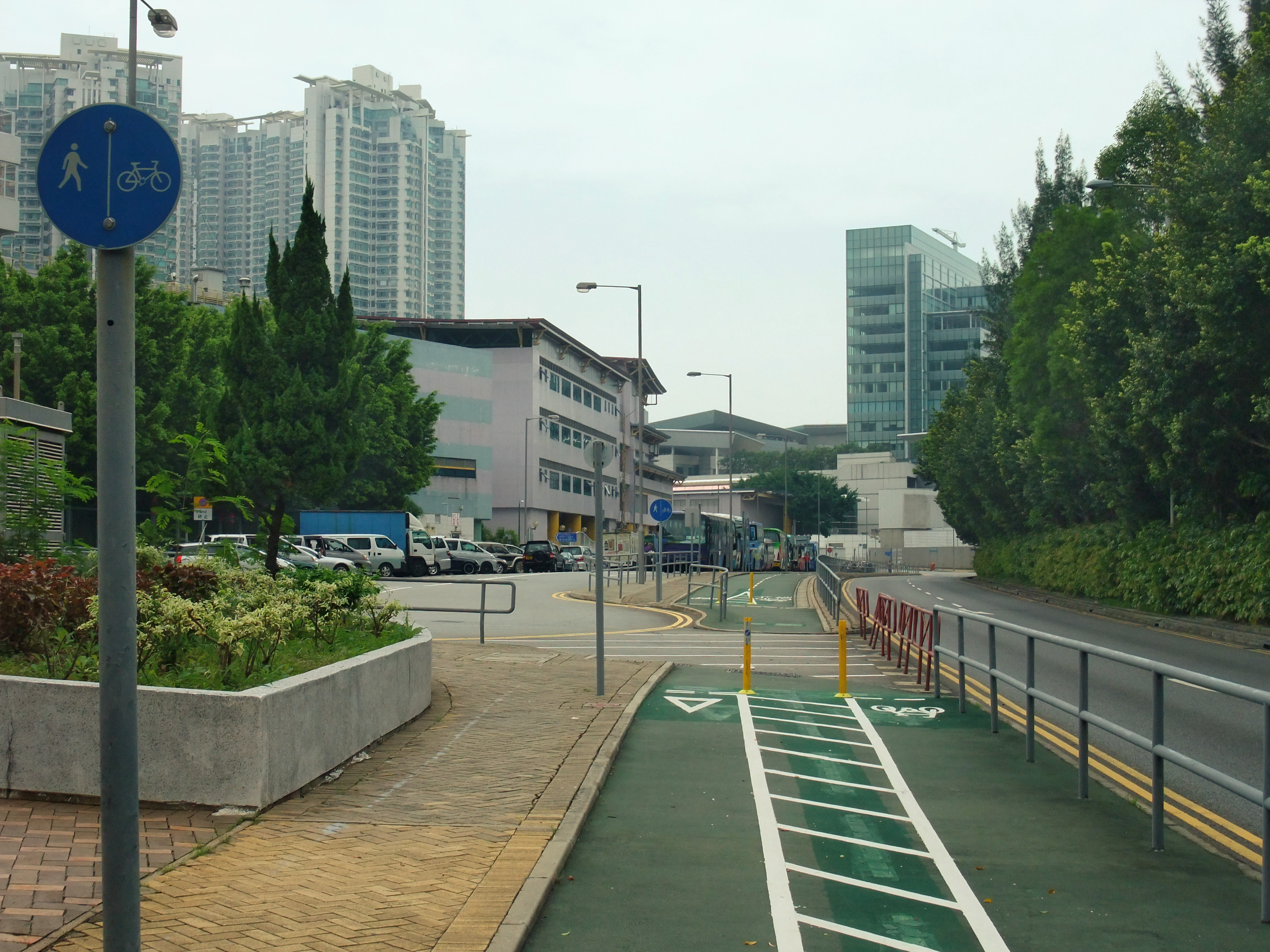
- Cheung Tung Road near the Tung Chung end, as in 2011.
- Interactive map of Cheung Tung Road
- Native name: 翔東路
- Location: Islands District, Lantau Island, New Territories, Hong Kong
- Coordinates: 22°18′43″N 113°59′15″E
- West end: Fu Tung Street, Tung Chung
- East end: Sunny Bay Road, Yam O

Cheung Tung Road 翔東路
- Traditional Chinese: 翔東路
- Simplified Chinese: 翔东路
Transcriptions
Standard Mandarin
- Hanyu Pinyin: Xiángdōng Lù
Hakka
- Romanization: xiang2 dong1 lu4
Yue: Cantonese
- Jyutping: cheung4 dong1 lou3

Cheung Tung Road (Chinese: 翔東路) is a road in Islands District, Hong Kong, running between Tung Chung, Discovery Bay Tunnel, and Yam O. It begins at Fu Tung Road near Tung Chung Station in the west, and runs parallel against the North Lantau Highway, and passes near Pak Mong, Siu Ho Wan and the northern exit of the Discovery Bay Tunnel, before reaching Sunny Bay Road at Yam O, near Sunny Bay Station. It is the only access to Discovery Bay by road. It is currently a two-way road with one lane each way. The length of the road is around 11 km long.

== History ==
The road was granted its name in the Government Gazette on 29 August 1997. The first bus route, New Lantao Bus Route 36 running between Tung Chung and Hong Kong Disneyland Resort began service on 27 January 1998. The Tung Chung line, which runs parallel to the road, opened on 22 June 1998.

During this time, the road only stretched from Siu Ho Wan to Tung Chung. The Discovery Bay Tunnel came into service on 27 May 2000, at the end of Cheung Tung Road. Two buses connected Discovery Bay to Tung Chung and Hong Kong International Airport without intermediate stops. These buses are now named DB01R and DB02R respectively. The bus route DB03R connecting Discovery Bay with Sunny Bay Station was opened in 2005.

== Incidents ==
Due to the nature of Cheung Tung Road, being narrow and having no pedestrian or bike paths, and also carrying the only water pipes towards the Airport and Tung Chung, many incidents have happened on this road over the years of its operation.

=== Traffic Incidents ===
Cheung Tung Road is a popular biking site, without many road intersections and much traffic. However, the road is narrow, and has no designated pedestrian or bike paths. The road is a two-way road with one lane each way. This has led to many road accidents over the years, especially with bikers.

On 31 October 2021, a fatal accident occurred when a tour bus struck a biker from behind and ran over the biker. The biker was killed, and the driver of the tour bus was arrested. During the trial, he was acquitted of charges due to insufficient proof that he was driving dangerously.

On 31 August 2023, a major road accident caused 34 injuries when a school bus strayed off into the opposite lane and was hit by a public bus heading from Discovery Bay. The school bus was carrying students from Discovery College. The driver and 20 students were injured on the school bus, while 13 passengers were injured on the public bus. By 14:00, the section affected was reopened.

=== Water Pipe Incidents ===
The pressurized water pipe on Cheung Tung Road has a diameter of 1200 mm and has been operating starting before 1998. It was designed to last for 25 years, and many incidents have occurred towards this current decade.

A new 6.5-kilometer-long water pipe was built, starting August 2016, between the Siu Ho Wan Water Treatment Plant and the Tung Chung Water Pumping Station, while the old original pipe was being repaired. The construction work is planned to be completed in 2023.

On 3 November 2024 at 10 pm, a major incident occurred when the water pipe burst near Siu Ho Wan Water Treatment Plant, and was placed under repair, cutting off water supply to residents in Tung Chung. Relief was dispatched to all areas of Tung Chung, and the services at North Lantau Hospital was not affected. The water pipe was repaired by 10 am the next morning. The incident affected nearly 120 thousand residents for around 12 hours. The Water Supplies Department apologized for the incident.

=== Other Incidents ===
A minor wildfire broke out on 1 March 2018 near Yam O, and was quickly put out by firefighters. No injuries were reported.

== Future Development ==
To join in the future development of the Tung Chung East Extension, a new road interchange at Tai Ho Wan connecting Cheung Tung Road, North Lantau Highway and Tung Chung East will be built. New pressurized water pipes will also be built towards Tung Chung East that lead out from the current water pipe on Cheung Tung Road.

== Intersecting roads ==
Roads are listed West to East.

- Fu Tung Street
- Hong Kong Olympic Trail
- Discovery Bay Tunnel
- Sham Shui Kok Drive - to North Lantau Refuse Transfer Station.
- Sunny Bay Road

Cheung Tung Road runs parallel to the North Lantau Highway and Tung Chung line.

== See also ==
- Tung Chung
- Sunny Bay
- North Lantau Highway
- Discovery Bay Tunnel
- List of roads on Lantau Island
- List of streets and roads in Hong Kong
