= Tai Hau Wan =

Tai Hau Wan or Taihowan is a place name in Hong Kong:

- A former name of Telegraph Bay
- Sandy Bay, Hong Kong, a place north of Telegraph Bay
- Tai Ho Wan, a bay on the north shore of Lantau Island

== See also ==
- Tai Ho (disambiguation)
