= Discovery Bay Tunnel =

Tunnel on Lantau Island, Hong Kong

Coordinates: 22.309°N 114.006°E

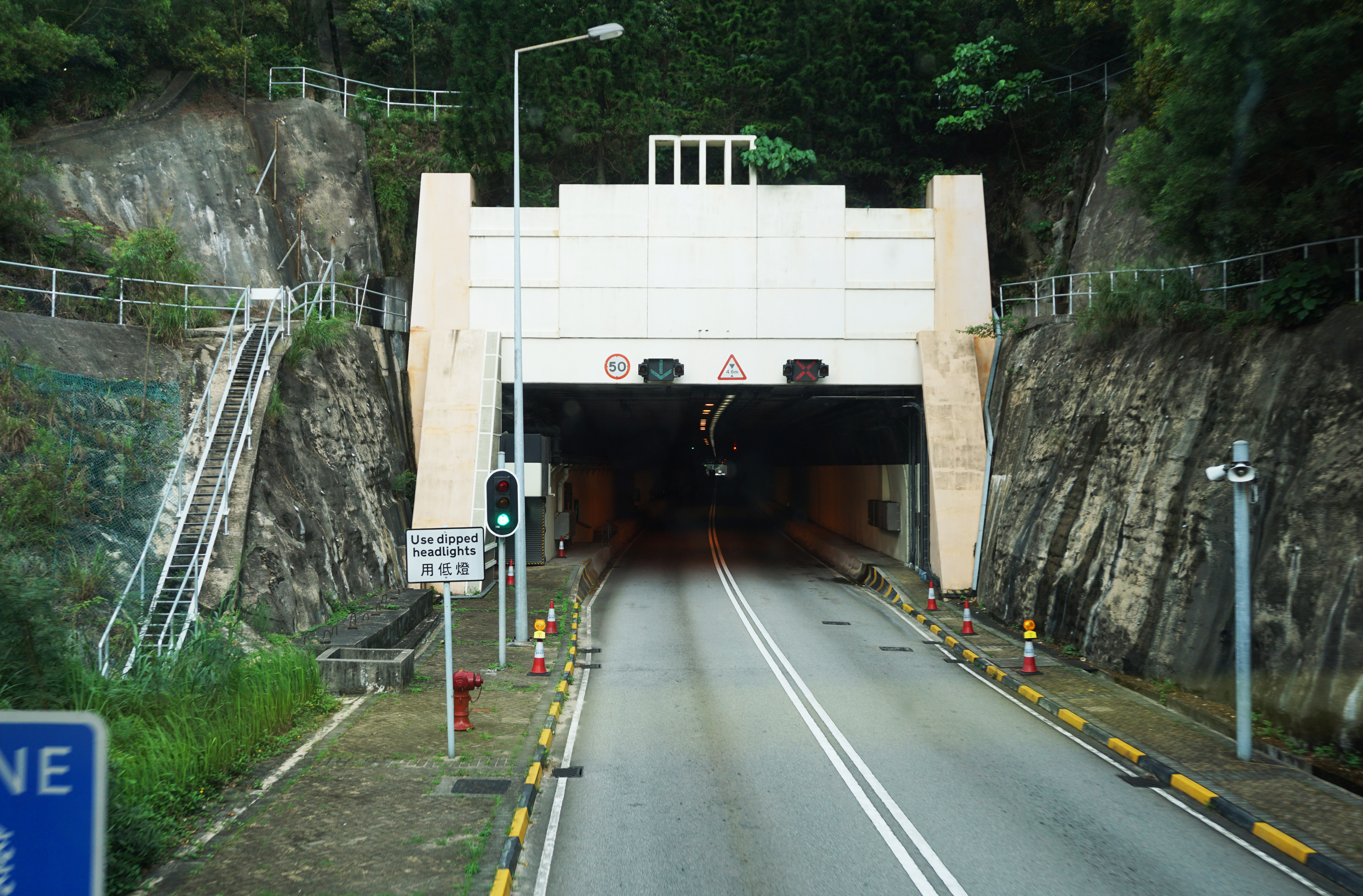
- Discovery Bay Tunnel entrance.
- Interactive map of Discovery Bay Tunnel

Overview
- Status: Active
- Start: Yi Pak Au
- End: Siu Ho Wan

Operation
- Opened: 27 May 2000; 26 years ago
- Owner: Hong Kong Government
- Operator: HKR International Limited
- Traffic: Vehicular

Technical
- No. of lanes: 2 lanes (1 lane per direction)
- Operating speed: 70 kilometres per hour (43 mph)

Discovery Bay Tunnel
- Traditional Chinese: 愉景灣隧道
- Jyutping: Jyu4 ging2 waan1 Seui6 dou6
- Literal meaning: Good View Bay Tunnel
Transcriptions
Standard Mandarin
- Hanyu Pinyin: Yújǐngwān Suìdào
Yue: Cantonese
- Yale Romanization: Yùh gíng wān Seuih douh
- Jyutping: Jyu4 ging2 waan1 Seui6 dou6

The Discovery Bay Tunnel (Chinese: 愉景灣隧道) is a toll tunnel that links Discovery Bay Road at Yi Pak Au to Cheung Tung Road at Siu Ho Wan beside the North Lantau Highway. It was built for the Discovery Bay residential development on the north-eastern coast of Lantau Island, Hong Kong.

It is open 24 hours everyday to vehicles approved by the Transport Department; including residents' coaches, goods vehicles for goods delivery and servicing functions, and Hong Kong Government vehicles are allowed to use the tunnel. The toll charge ranges between HK$ 50.00 to 250.00 depending on the type of vehicle.

As the development is car-free, private vehicles are discouraged from entering. Private cars or private delivery vans can only enter with special permits issued in advance, between the hours of 09:00 and 18:00 every day.

The tunnel is managed by HKR International Limited.
