= Lo Fu Tau =

Mountain on Lantau Island, Hong Kong

- 老虎頭
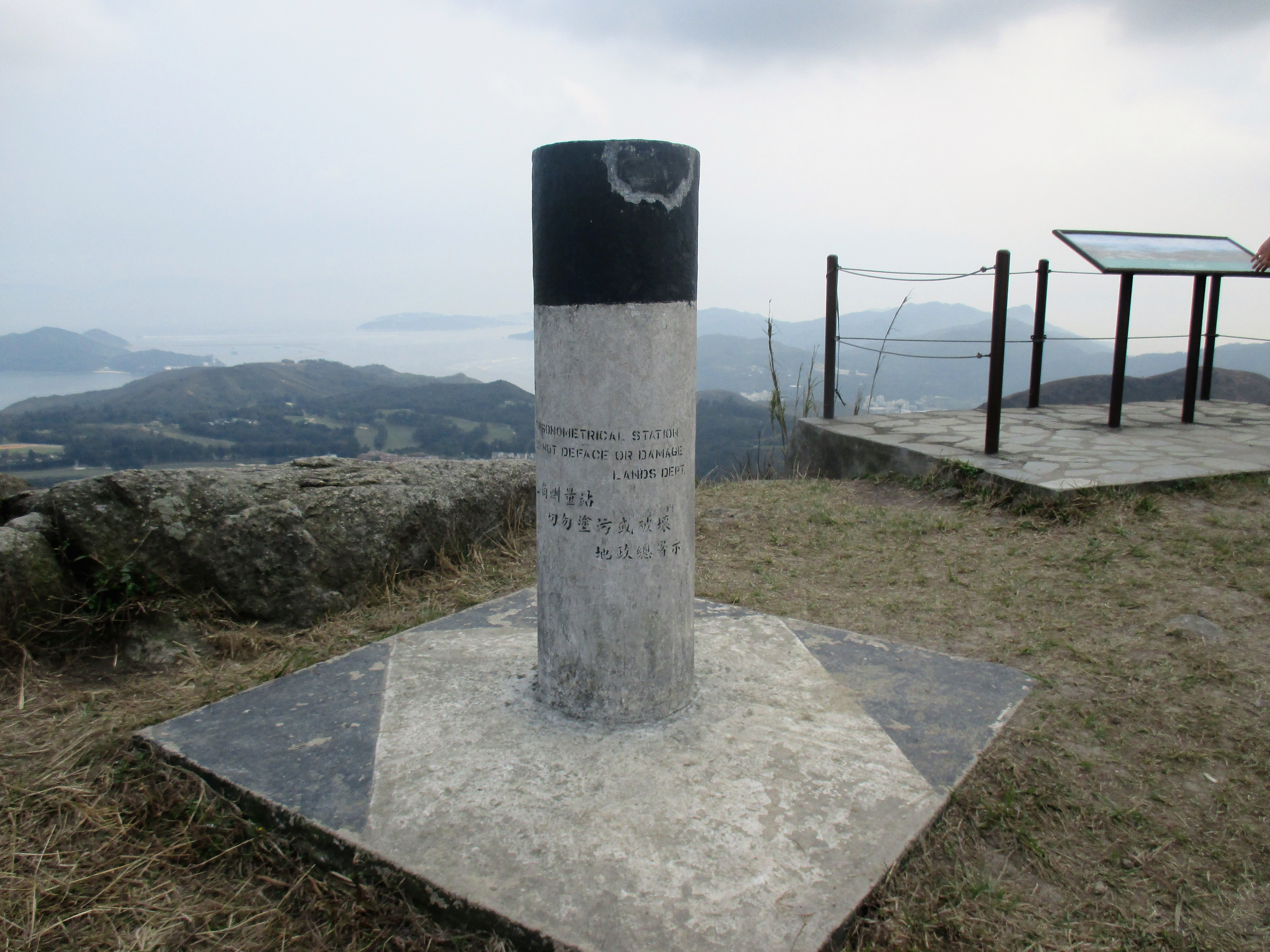
- Trigonometrical station at Lo Fu Tau

Highest point
- Elevation: 465 m (1,526 ft)
- Coordinates: 22°17′59″N 114°00′01″E

Geography
- Location within Hong Kong
- Location: Lantau Island, Hong Kong

Lo Fu Tau (Chinese: 老虎頭; lit. 'Tiger's Head') is a mountain on Lantau Island, Hong Kong, with a height of 465 metres (1,526 ft) above sea level.

== Geology ==
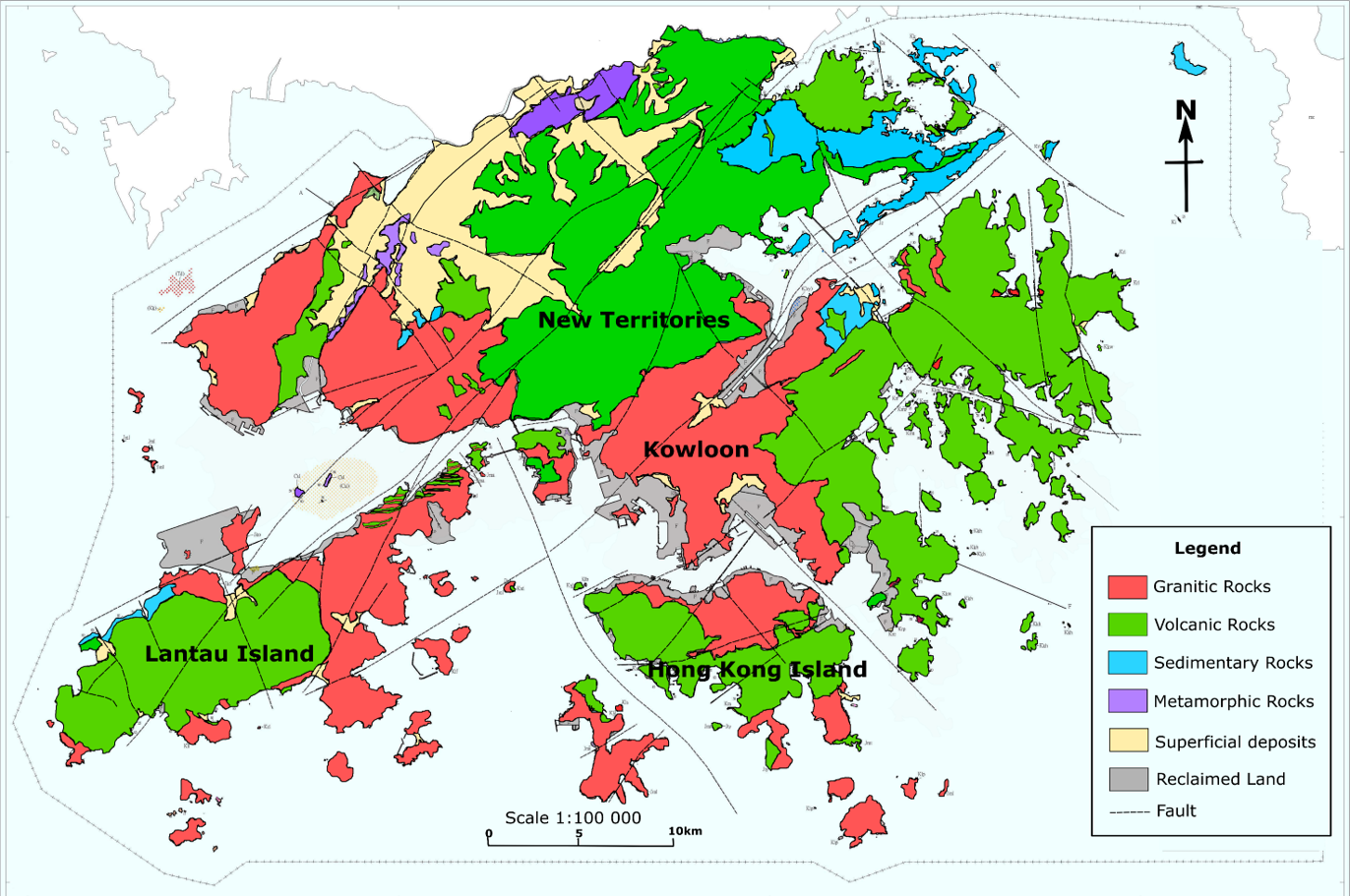
Lo Fu Tau is in the Red area on Lantau Island

Lo Fu Tau is formed by Granitic rocks, unlike many of the tallest mountains on Lantau Island, such as Lantau Peak, which are formed by Volcanic rocks.

== Geography ==
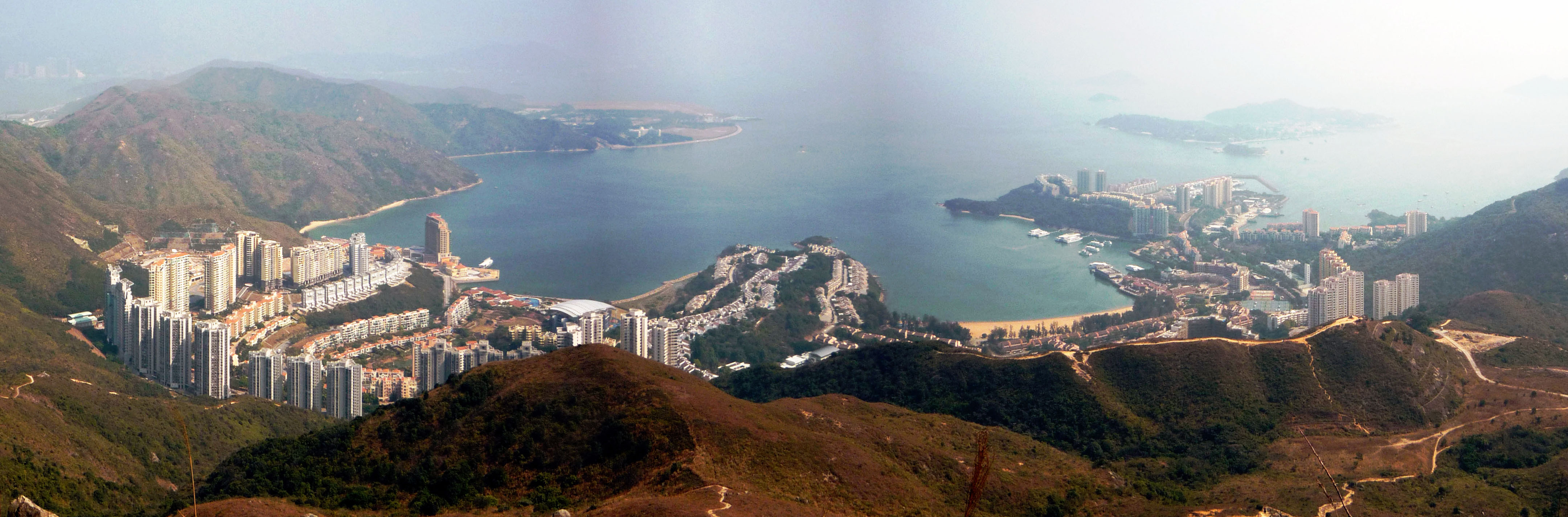
View from Tiger's Head of Discovery Bay

Lo Fu Tau is the tallest mountain in the Discovery Bay area. It is a popular spot for hiking and trail running enthusiasts. To the south is Mui Wo, while to the east is Discovery Bay.

== See also ==
- List of mountains, peaks and hills in Hong Kong
