= Pak Mong =

Village on Lantau Island, in Hong Kong

Coordinates: 22.29537°N 113.97129°E

Pak Mong 白芒
- Village
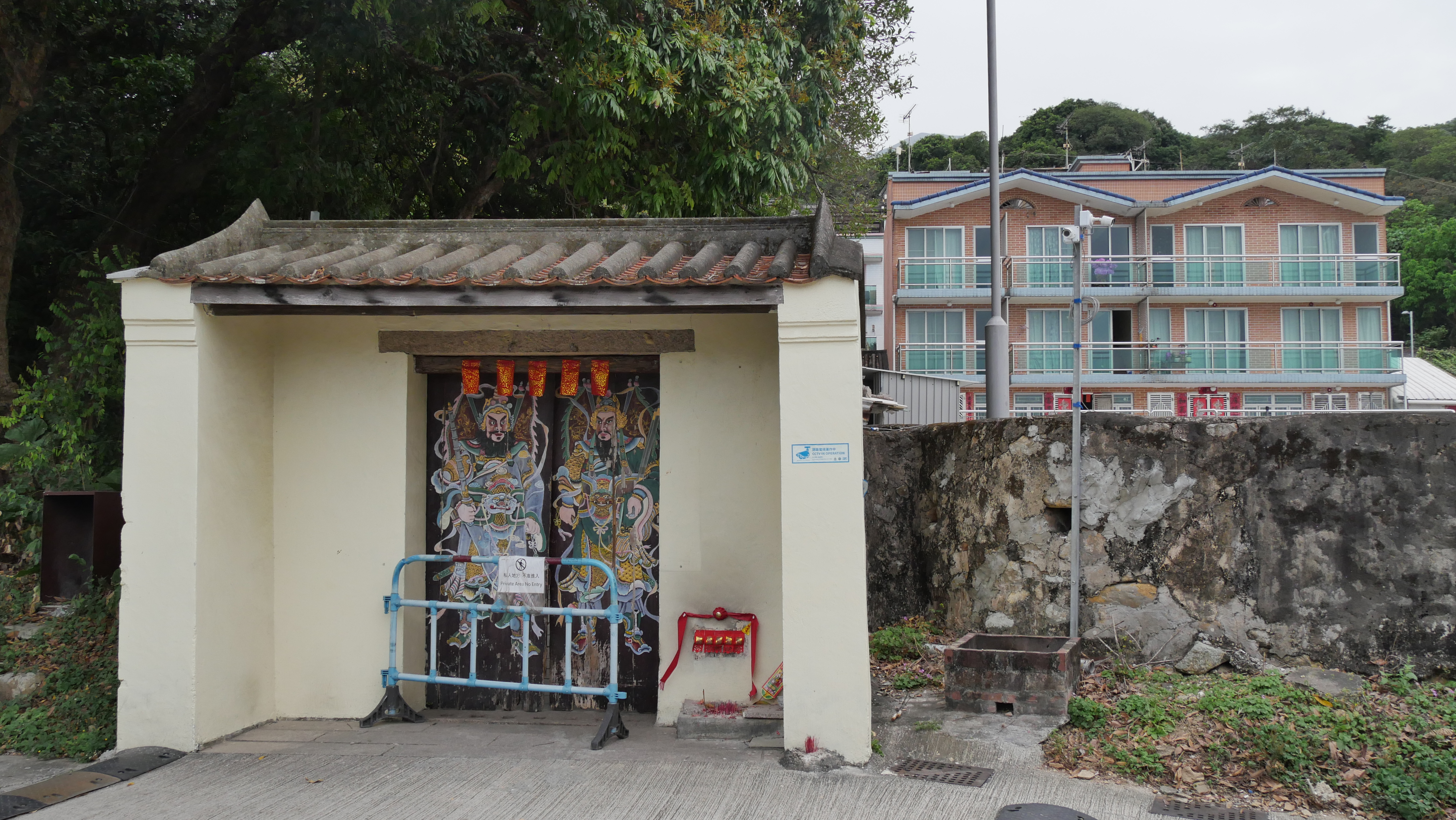
- Entrance gate of Pak Mong (outside view).

- Location within Hong Kong
- Country: China
- SAR: Hong Kong
- Island: Lantau Island
- Established: 16th or 17th century
- Founder: Hakka settlers
- Time zone: UTC+8:00 (HKT)

Pak Mong
- Chinese: 白芒
- Literal meaning: white miscanthus
Transcriptions
Standard Mandarin
- Hanyu Pinyin: Báimáng
Yue: Cantonese
- Jyutping: bak3 mong1

Pak Mong (Chinese: 白芒; lit. 'white miscanthus') is a village on Lantau Island, Hong Kong, located near Tai Ho Wan, a bay on the northern shore of Lantau Island, and northeast of Tung Chung.

== Administration ==
Pak Mong is a recognized village under the New Territories Small House Policy.

== History ==
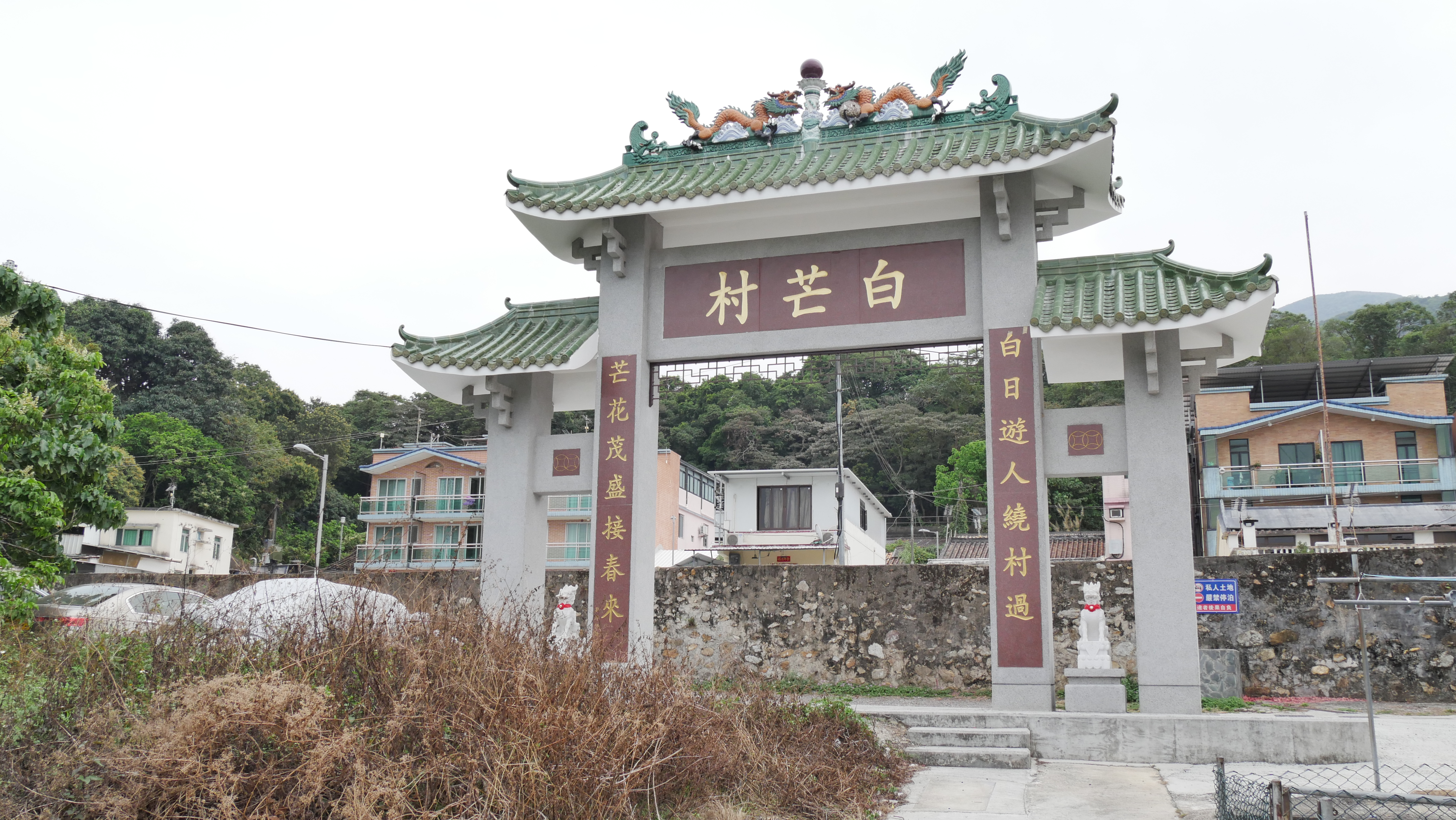
Paifang of Pak Mong

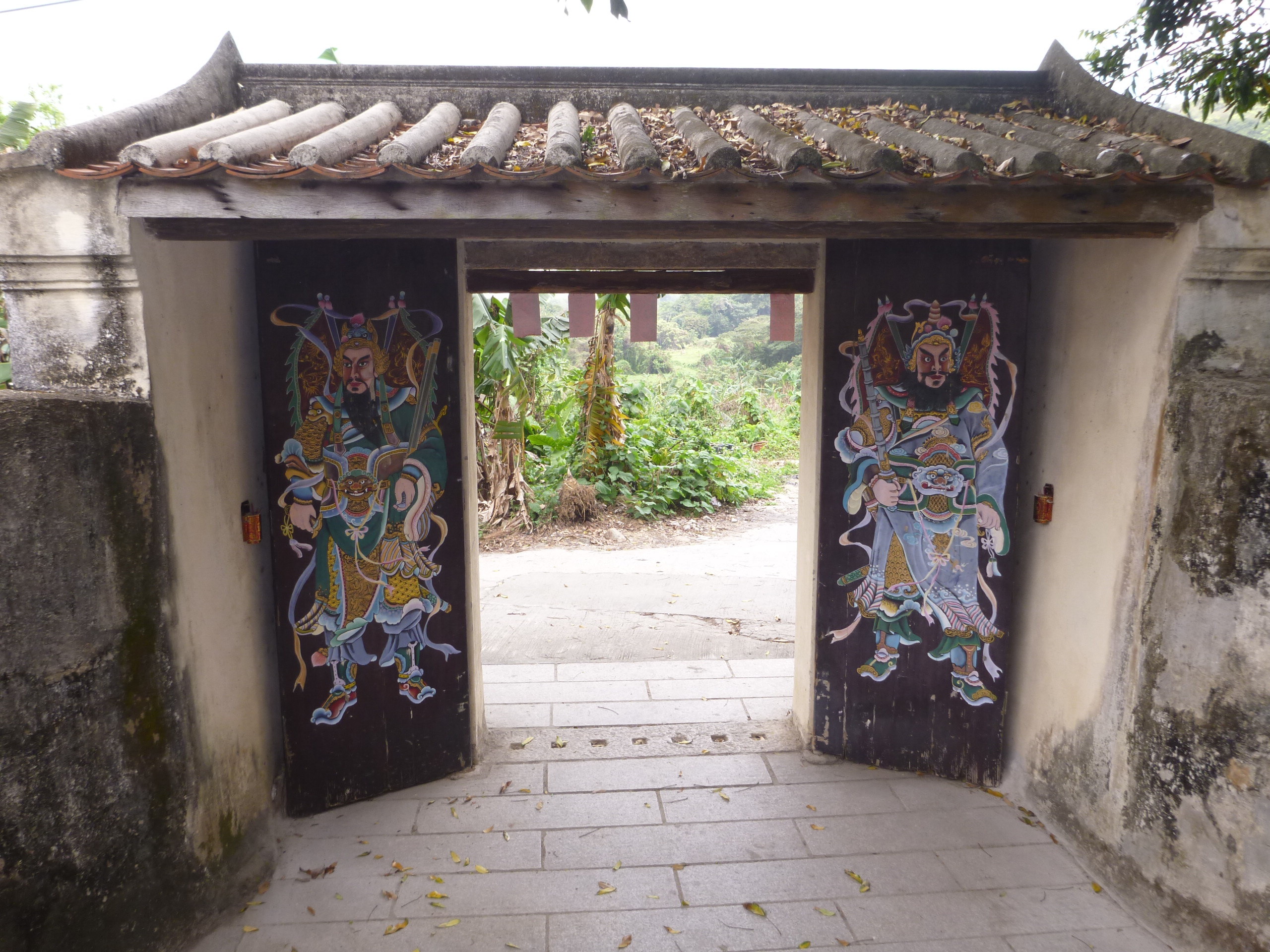
Entrance gate of Pak Mong (inside view)

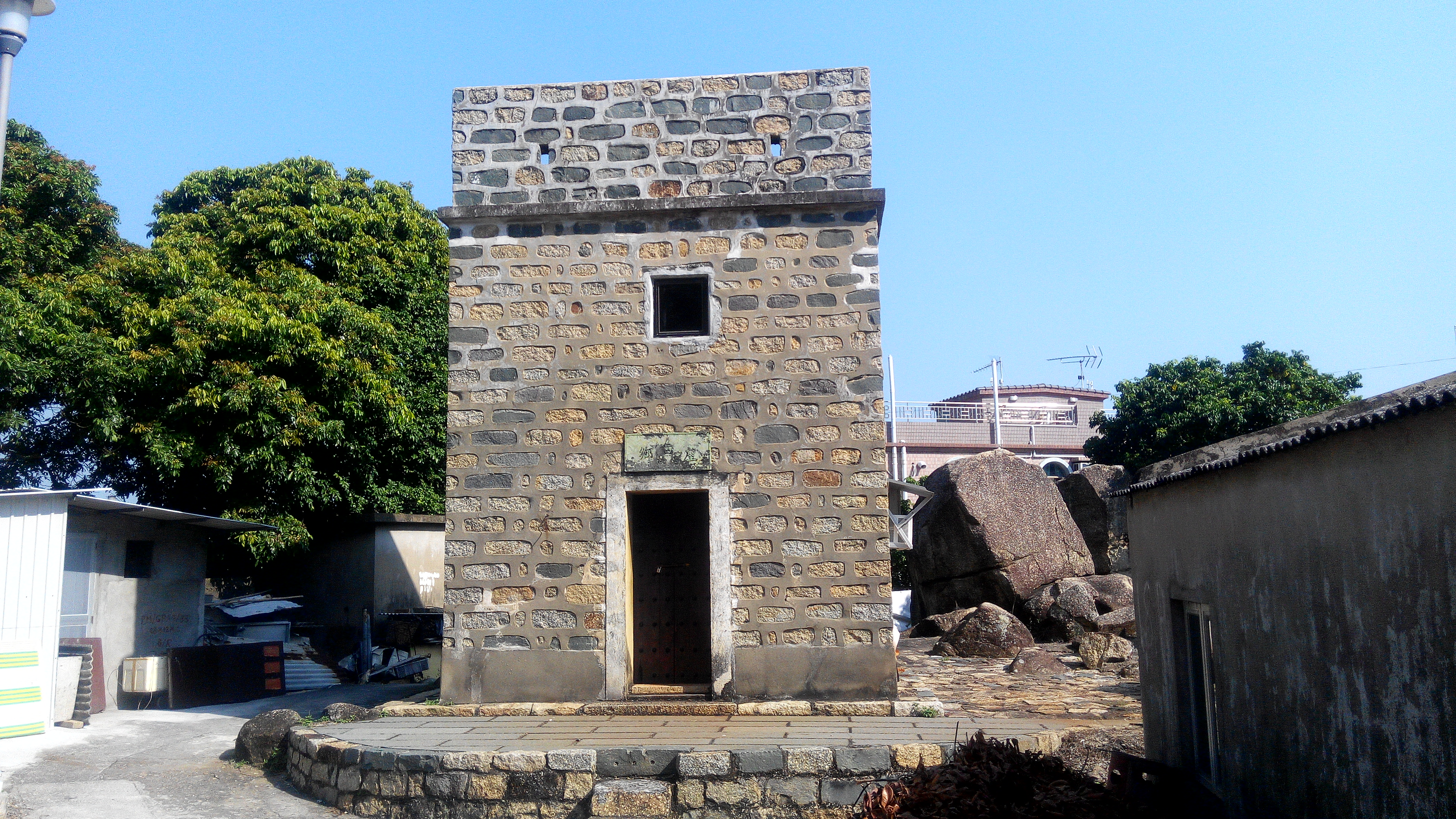
Pak Mong watchtower

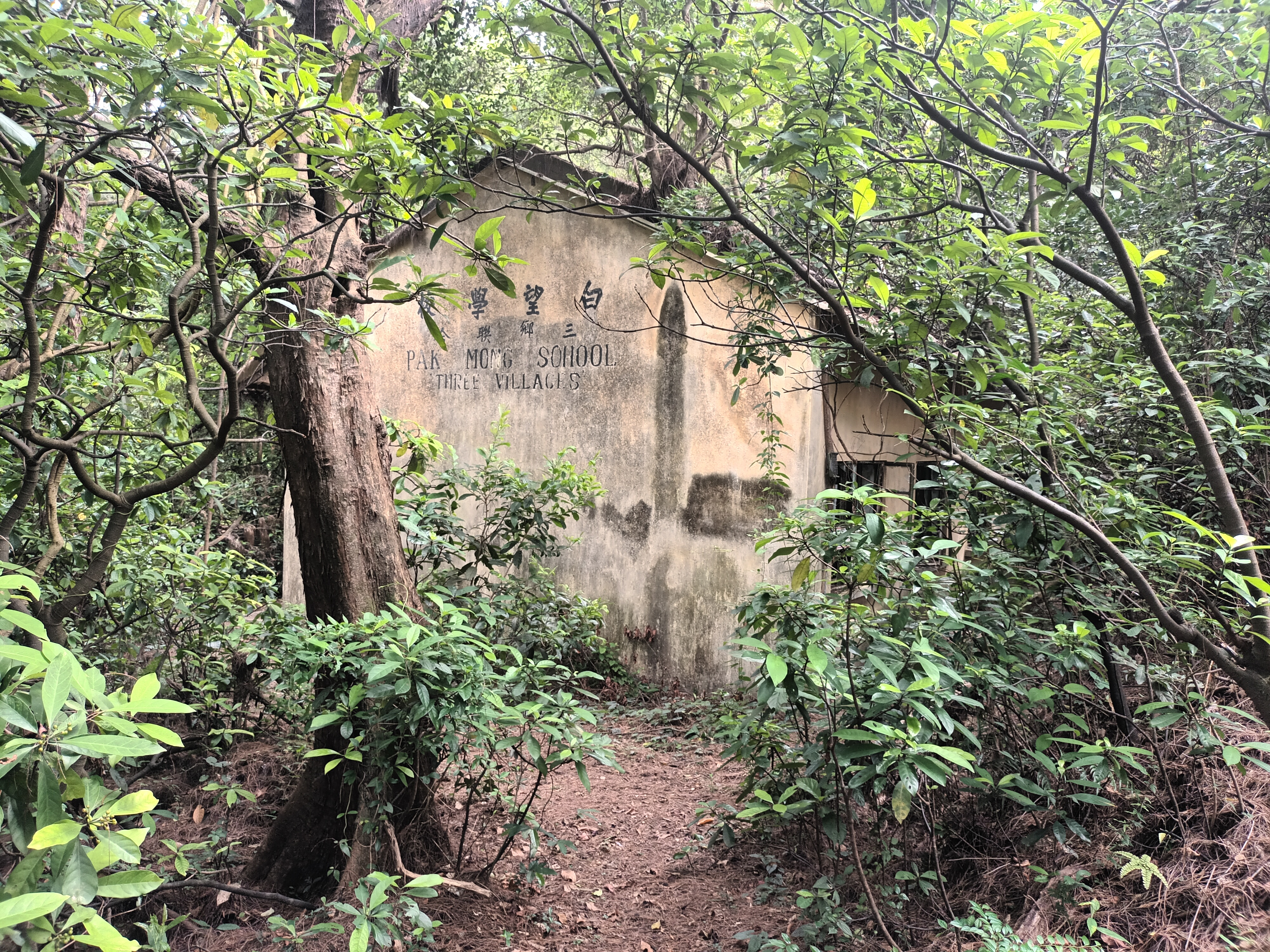
Former Pak Mong School

The village was founded by Hakka settlers during the Ming period in the 16th and 17th centuries, and prospered in the trade from Canton to Cheung Chau. Ferries from Castle Peak (old Tuen Mun) to Pak Mong to Mui Wo to Cheung Chau facilitated the trade. The kai-to ferry service between Tuen Mun and Pak Mong only terminating in 1986.

Pak Mong was historically part of the San Heung (三鄉) community, consisting of the villages of Pak Mong, Ngau Kwu Long and Tai Ho.

== Features ==
The 18th-century entrance gate of the village, an enclosing wall extending to the east and north of the village and a watchtower (built in the 1940s) were built to protect the village against pirates and bandits. The watchtower is listed as a Grade II Historic Building, while the entrance gate is listed as a Grade III Historic Building.

There is an abandoned village school, built in 1955, which at its peak in 1975 had around 30 children. Following abandonment of agriculture and depopulation, it was closed down in 1985.

A natural stream flows along the western boundary of Pak Mong Village, and there is a fung shui wood behind the village. A total of 96 plant species were recorded in this fung shui wood, including Aquilaria sinensis ('Incense Tree').

The village is at the start of the Hong Kong Olympic Trail (and also connects with the Islands Nature Heritage Trail), a 5.6 km long "Olympic Route" connecting to Mui Wo that was opened in celebration of Hong Kong's hosting of the equestrian events in the July 2008 Olympics.

== Access ==
The only road access to Pak Mong is by Cheung Tung Road from the north. There is no road access towards the south.

A trail links Pak Mong and Cheung Tung Road past Pak Mong towards the south towards Mui Wo, which is named Islands Nature Heritage Trail - Mui Wo Section, or the Olympic Trail.

== See also ==
- Walled villages of Hong Kong
