= Ngau Kwu Long =

Village of Hong Kong

Coordinates: 22.29116°N 113.97699°E

- Chinese: 牛牯塱
- Literal meaning: cattle pasture valley
Transcriptions
Standard Mandarin
- Hanyu Pinyin: Niúgǔláng
Yue: Cantonese
- Jyutping: ngau4 gwu2 long4

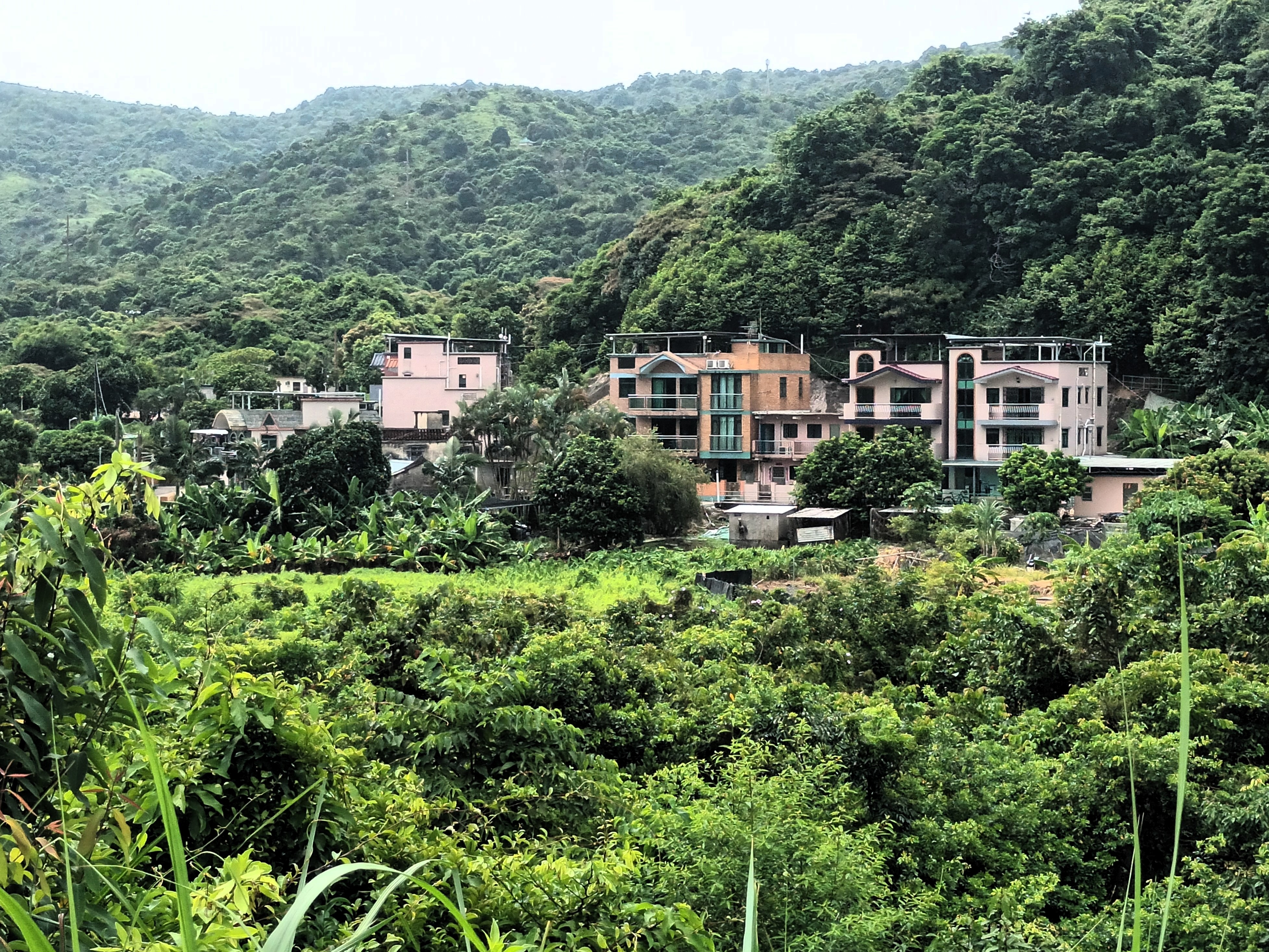
view of Ngau Kwu Long

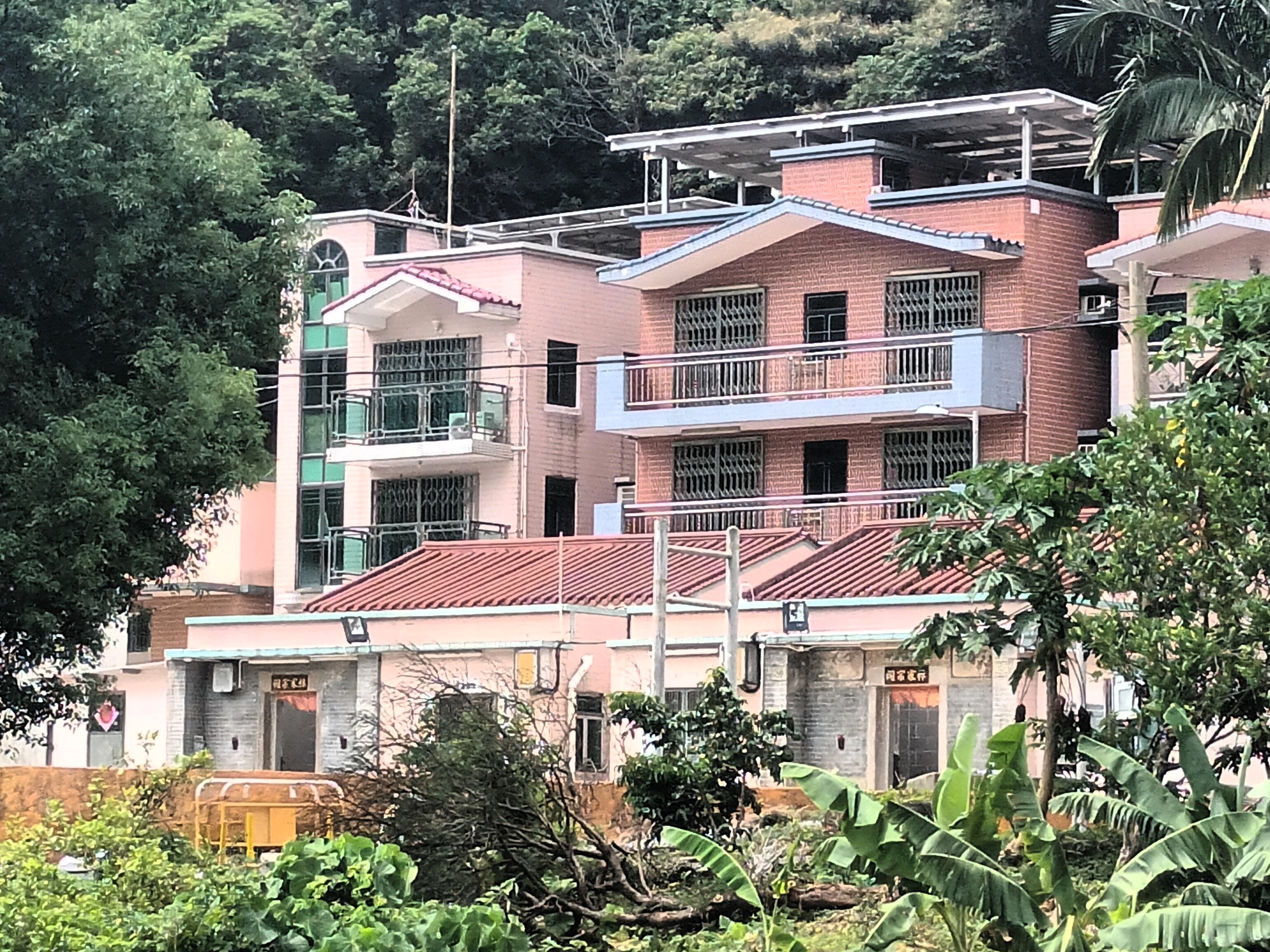
Lam Ancestral Hall (East) and Lam Ancestral Hall (West), both in the lower part of the picture

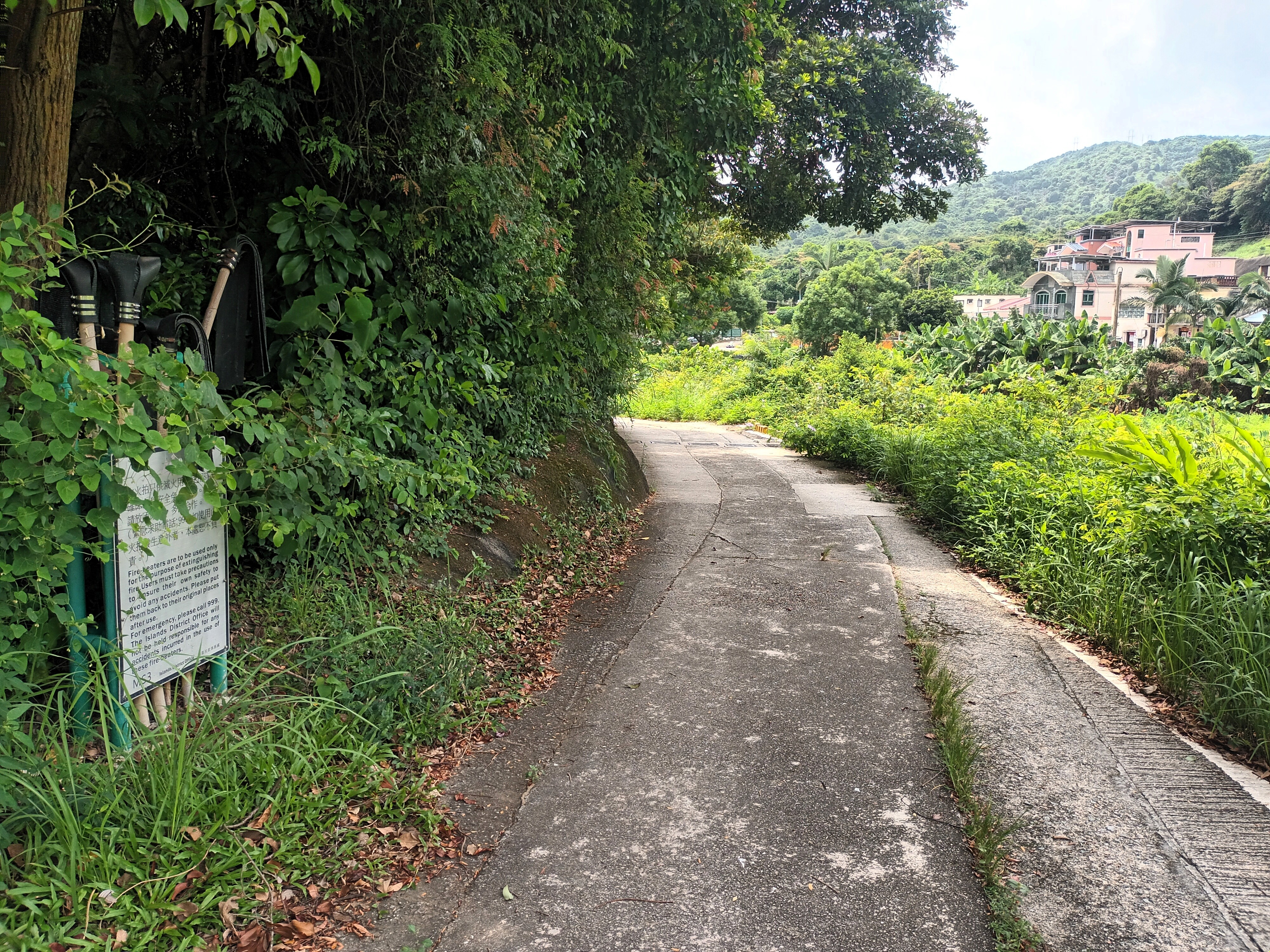
Access road, part of the Hong Kong Olympic Trail

Ngau Kwu Long (Chinese: 牛牯塱; lit. 'cattle pasture valley') is a village on Lantau Island, Hong Kong, located near Tai Ho Wan, a bay on the northern shore of Lantau Island, and northeast of Tung Chung.

== Administration ==
Ngau Kwu Long is a recognized village under the New Territories Small House Policy.

== History ==
Ngau Kwu Long is a single-surname village, occupied by members of the Lam (林) family. The Lams originated from Putian in Fujian province. They moved to Chayuan (茶園) of Dongguan in Guangdong province, and a branch of the family moved to Ngau Kwu Long during the reign of Qianlong Emperor (1736-1796).

Ngau Kwu Long was historically part of the San Heung (三鄉) community, consisting of the villages of Pak Mong, Ngau Kwu Long and Tai Ho. The village was badly damaged in the Japanese Occupation of Hong Kong (1941–45), being pillaged by bandits and 13 houses and the two ancestral halls were burnt down or seriously damaged by the Japanese as they were attacked by guerrillas. Much of the local population died prematurely at this time and many of the villagers were also executed here and in Mui Wo.

== Access ==
The village is located along the Hong Kong Olympic Trail, a 5.6 km long "Olympic Route" connecting Pak Mong to Mui Wo that was opened in celebration of Hong Kong's hosting of the equestrian events in the July 2008 Olympics. There is no road access to the village.
