= Tai Ho Village =

Village of Hong Kong

Coordinates: 22.28819°N 113.97895°E

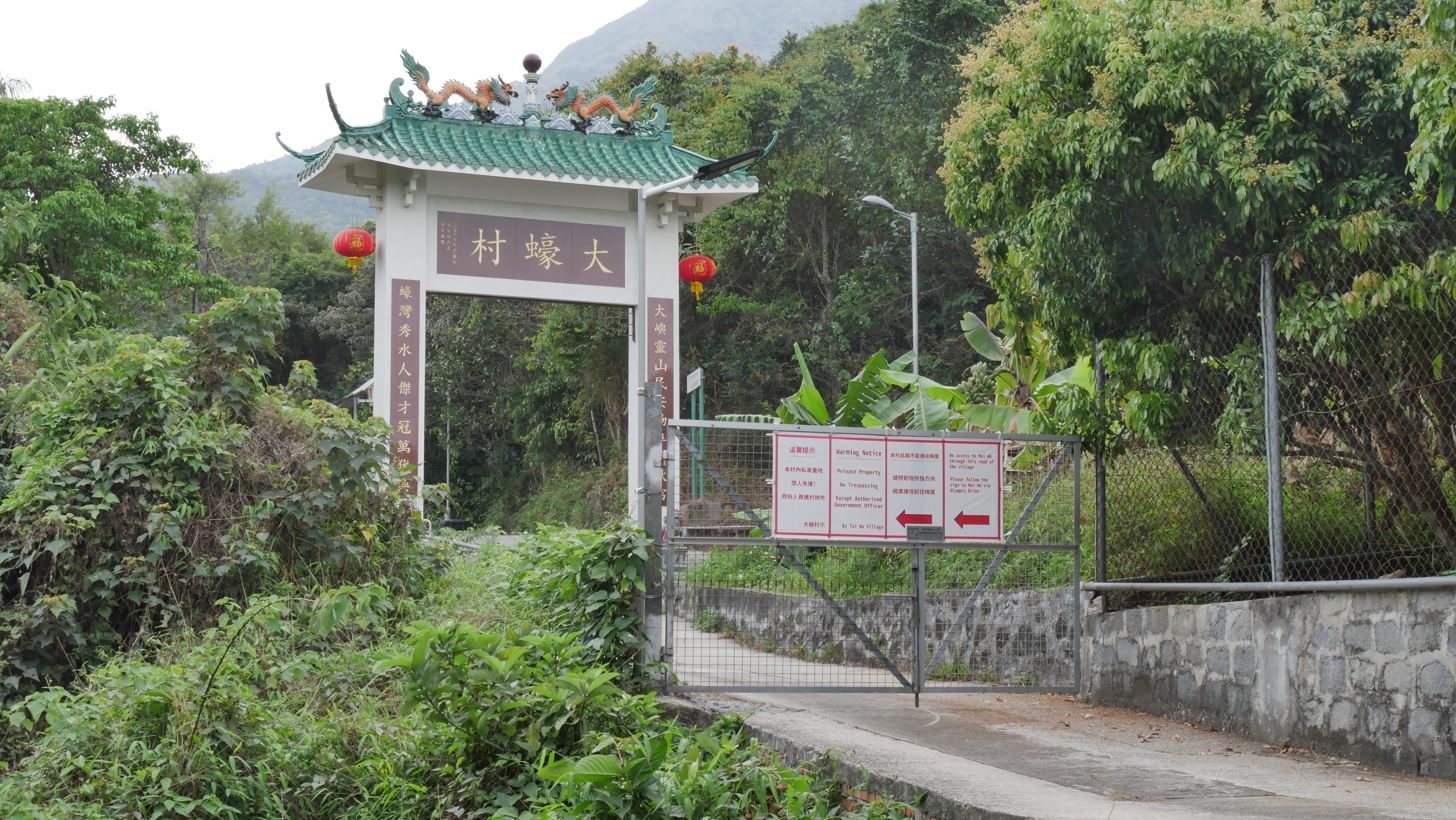
Paifang of Tai Ho Village and metal gate blocking the road in 2021.

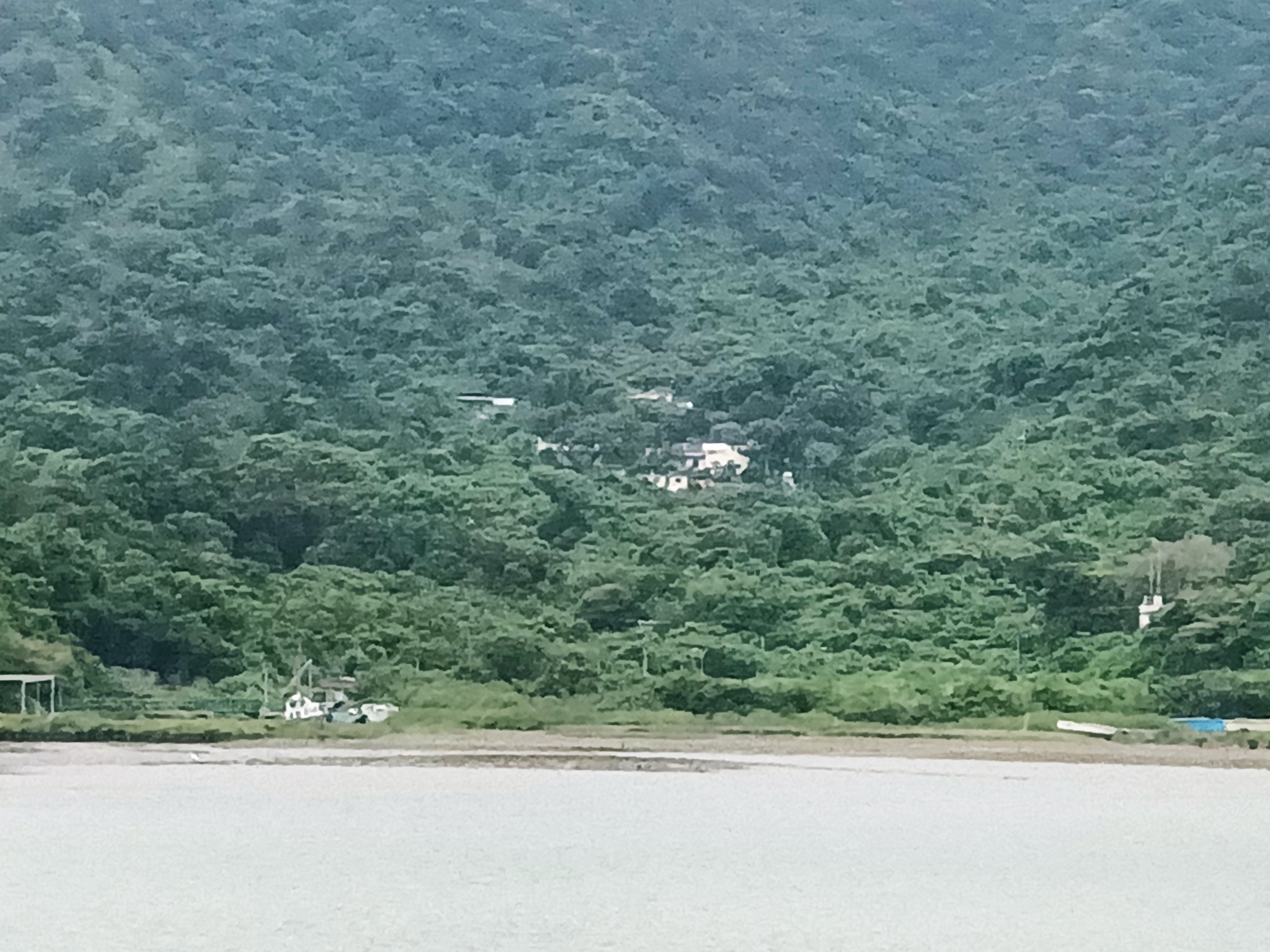
Tai Ho Village viewed from the northern shore of Tai Ho Wan.

Tai Ho Village or Tai Ho Tsuen (Chinese: 大蠔村; lit. 'big oyster village') is a village on Lantau Island, Hong Kong, located near Tai Ho Wan, a bay on the northern shore of Lantau Island, and northeast of Tung Chung.

== Administration ==
Tai Ho is a recognized village under the New Territories Small House Policy.

== History ==
Tai Ho was historically is a multi-surname Hakka village. It was historically part of the San Heung (三鄉) community, consisting of the villages of Pak Mong, Ngau Kwu Long and Tai Ho.
