= Discovery Bay =

Residential area located in Lantau Island, Hong Kong

Discovery Bay, Hong Kong 愉景灣

- Location of Discovery Bay within Hong Kong
- Coordinates: 22°17′44″N 114°00′59″E

Area
  - Total: 6.5 km^{2} (2.5 sq mi)

Population (2021)
  - Total: 19,336 45% Chinese 25% White 11.2% Filipino
  - Density: 3,000/km^{2} (7,700/sq mi)
- Website: www.dbay.hk

Discovery Bay
- Traditional Chinese: 愉景灣
- Simplified Chinese: 愉景湾
Transcriptions
Standard Mandarin
- Hanyu Pinyin: Yú jǐng Wān
- IPA: [y̌.tɕìŋ.wán]
Yue: Cantonese
- Yale Romanization: Yùh gíng wān
- Jyutping: Jyu^{4} ging^{2} waan^{1}
- IPA: [jy̏ːkɪ̌ŋ wáːn]

Discovery Bay is a residential community located on Lantau Island in Hong Kong.

The 2021 census recorded a population of 19,336 residents in DB, with 55% of them being non-Chinese. DB is home to a significant community composed of expatriates from over fifty countries. It is one of the most ethnically diverse places in Hong Kong. With only 45% of the population being Chinese, the largest ethnic minority groups in the community is white (25%) and Filipinos (11.2%). DB is located 2 km west of Hong Kong Disneyland Resort and approximately 12 km west from the nearest point on Hong Kong Island.

Discovery Bay is a key community in Lantau Island (after Tung Chung) and enjoys a very low plot ratio of 0.15.

== History ==
Map

In May 1973, the Hong Kong Resort Company (HKR) was established by Edward Wong Wing-cheung, a Hong Kong merchant. Following two years of planning and negotiation, a 'Master Plan' was agreed in December 1975 between HKR and the Hong Kong government. By New Grant No. 6122 of 10 September 1976, HKR agreed to surrender title to 800 Hong Kong properties, in total amounting to over 6.6 million square feet of New Territories agricultural land and buildings, in exchange for ten times that area at Discovery Bay. The plan called for development, on Lot 385 at Tai Pak Wan, of "membership club houses and a leisure resort and associated facilities which shall include an hotel or hotels ... a cable-car system ... and a non-membership golf course ..." In addition, HKR handed over HK$61.5 million in exchange for the grant and undertook to spend no less than another HK$600 million on development (excluding site formation costs) within 10 years of the grant.

Within months, however, Wong faced financial difficulty. The Soviet-government-controlled Moscow Narodny Bank filed a writ in Hong Kong on 1 April 1977 against Wong himself for return of US$7 million advanced in 1973, as well as against Wong's Panamanian bank holding company, Paclantic Financing Co., Inc. (which was HKR's majority shareholder), for US$22.12 million in proceedings in Panama. Both the Chinese and British governments were concerned to prevent the property rights to the single largest piece of privately controlled land in Hong Kong falling into the hands of the Russian bank during times of deepening political uncertainty for Hong Kong. Sir David Akers-Jones, then-Secretary for the New Territories, led the government's efforts to avert that prospect, steering HKR into the hands of Hong Kong-based Chinese industrialist Cha Chi-ming. It is suspected that Cha decided to bid for the project under the instruction of Liao Chengzhi, then director of China's Hong Kong and Macao Affairs Office to avoid Soviet acquisition of Hong Kong land.

Having lost control of HKR and facing bankruptcy proceedings, Wong left Hong Kong in January 1977 while mooting the establishment of a Pacific Atlantic Bank of Miami and going into the casino business with the Anderson group of whom one Robert B. Anderson, of One Rockefeller Plaza, had been a fellow director on the HKR board.

Cha Chi-ming, better known for running China Dyeing Works Ltd during the 1970s, an international textile group, acquired equity interest in HKR in 1977. By 1979 all debts were paid off and work started on the reservoir and the core infrastructure but for a very different sort of project – essentially a residential community offering a relaxed lifestyle. This decision was revisited in 2004 when it was discovered that Akers-Jones did not seek approval from the Executive Council (ExCo) for the deviation from the terms of the Land Grant. In a 2004 report by the government's Audit Commission, the Lands Department was severely criticised for allowing this to happen, particularly since Akers-Jones did not call on HKR under Cha to pay any additional land premium. After retiring from government, in 2000 Akers-Jones joined the board of Mingly Corporation, also controlled by Cha.

Unlike other large Hong Kong developments, everything in DB was built with private money, including roads, electricity and the water supply. The government-operated fire and police station, community hall and the government-aided primary school were also built by the developer. These developments have to be approved and checked by the government with the official Master Plan version 6.0a in 2003, including the major extension in 2003 in Yi Pak Wan.

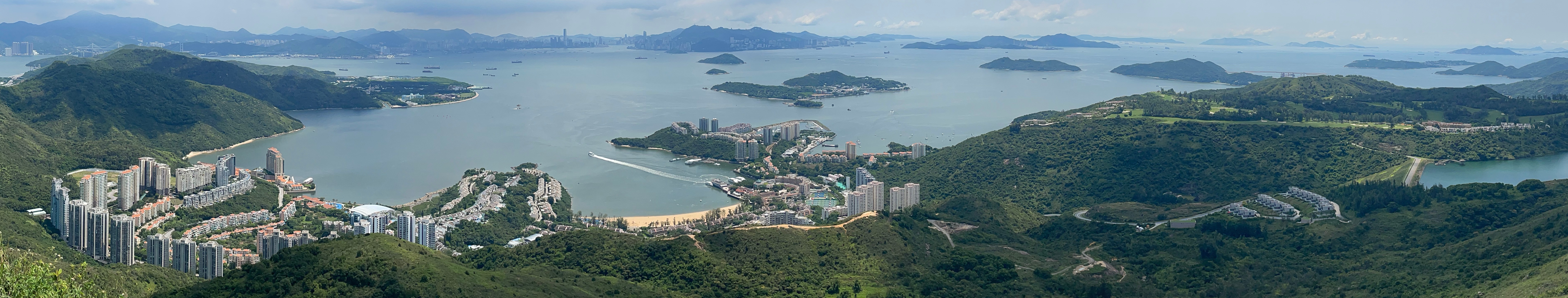
Discovery Bay, Lantau Island (panorama)

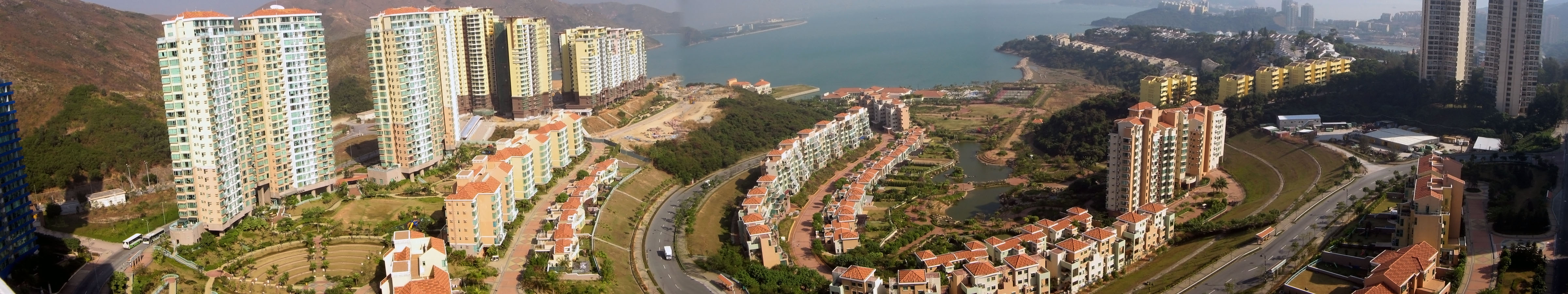
Yi Pak Bay; Discovery Bay, Lantau Island

== Geography ==
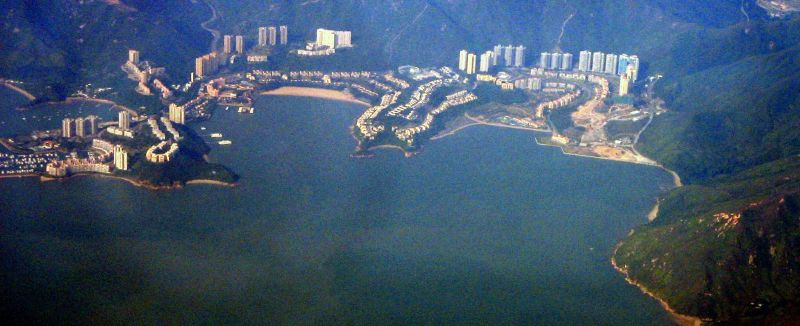
Discovery Bay – aerial view

As with most of the terrain in Hong Kong, Lantau Island seems to be a set of hills that rise out of the water. DB is wedged between the hills and the sea and both environments are accessible from the edges of the developed areas. The hills directly behind DB reach up to 465 m (1,526 ft), and the hiking trails that traverse all the peaks on Lantau Island are accessible from those hills. The hills of Lantau tend to fall dramatically into jungle-covered valleys that spread up into verdant, grass-covered hills. DB has a series of rock pools which lead to one such valley and into a man-made addition to the water-drainage system. (Note: DB has switched to Government potable water supply since 2000)

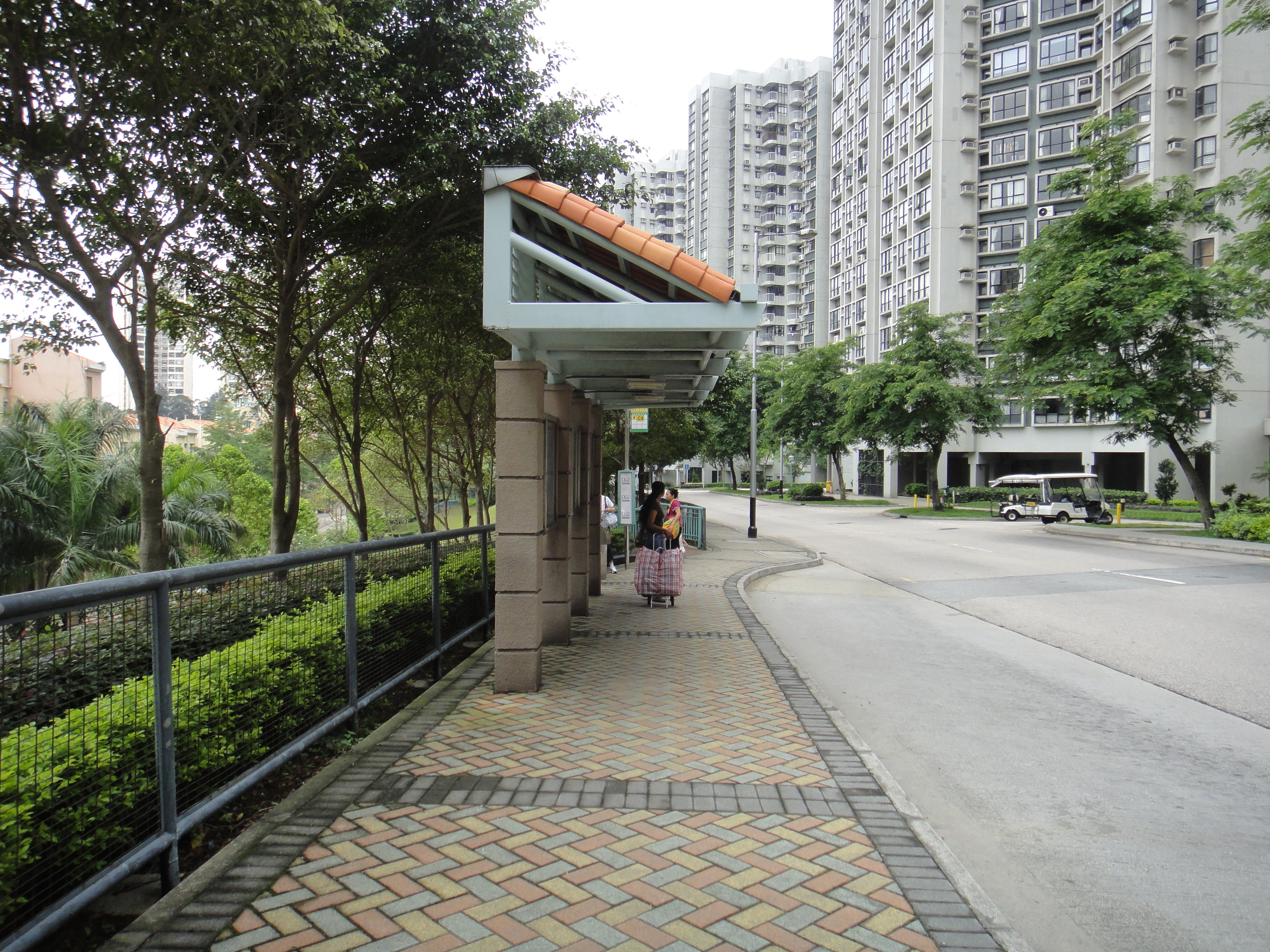
A view of Greenvale Village and Greenvale Village bus terminal in Discovery Bay

=== Environment ===
DB is home to animals of many kinds, most of which are domestic pets. There are, however, a number of wild species that lived or are living on Lantau Island that can be found in and around DB. Most of these creatures are birds such as finches, tits, gulls and kites. Until the construction of the new Hong Kong International Airport in Chek Lap Kok, wild cattle and water buffalo thrived in the pasture-like hills. Increasingly vigorous development all over Hong Kong has reduced the habitat of the local dolphin and whale populations. The most famous of these is the Chinese white dolphin, often called the pink dolphin due to a slight pinkish cast to their skin. (See Environment of Hong Kong)

=== Climate ===
Discovery Bay has a sub-tropical climate characterised by distinct seasons. Summers are usually from June to August, with temperatures often within the mid 20s to low 30s Celsius (80s to 90s Fahrenheit) range. Winters start in December and run till February, with temperatures ranging from teens to low 20s Celsius (high 50s to low 70s Fahrenheit).

As DB is a coastal region, typhoon season (May–November) provides a more intense weather experience for residents. Severe tropical storms tend to only occur later in the season, typically August and September. These storms bring torrential rain and strong winds to the region, sometimes leading to a temporary suspension of ferry services to the resort town.

Climate data for Discovery Bay (1982–2012)
| Month | Jan | Feb | Mar | Apr | May | Jun | Jul | Aug | Sep | Oct | Nov | Dec | Year |
|---|---|---|---|---|---|---|---|---|---|---|---|---|---|
| Mean daily maximum °C (°F) | 18.7 (65.7) | 18.4 (65.1) | 20.9 (69.6) | 24.8 (76.6) | 28.5 (83.3) | 30.3 (86.5) | 31.2 (88.2) | 31.1 (88.0) | 30.3 (86.5) | 27.9 (82.2) | 24.2 (75.6) | 20.4 (68.7) | 25.6 (78.1) |
| Daily mean °C (°F) | 15.6 (60.1) | 15.6 (60.1) | 18.2 (64.8) | 22.1 (71.8) | 25.7 (78.3) | 27.7 (81.9) | 28.3 (82.9) | 28.5 (83.3) | 27.5 (81.5) | 24.8 (76.6) | 21.0 (69.8) | 17.2 (63.0) | 22.7 (72.9) |
| Mean daily minimum °C (°F) | 12.5 (54.5) | 12.8 (55.0) | 15.5 (59.9) | 19.4 (66.9) | 23.0 (73.4) | 25.2 (77.4) | 25.5 (77.9) | 25.9 (78.6) | 24.8 (76.6) | 21.7 (71.1) | 17.8 (64.0) | 14.0 (57.2) | 19.8 (67.6) |
Source: CLIMATE-DATA.ORG

=== Environmental awareness ===
DB was awarded the Green Property Management Award (Private Housing) in 2002. To make DB a greener town, DBSML, the management company of DB, has replaced conventional ballasts with energy-saving tubes. The number of lights in common corridors and main entrances of buildings were re-assessed and unnecessary lights were removed. It was thought that a 30% reduction in electricity charges was achieved in La Vista, one of the villages. Apart from energy reduction, flea market, old books collection, old clothes collection and used household items collection have been held on a regular basis to promote recycling.

== Current development ==
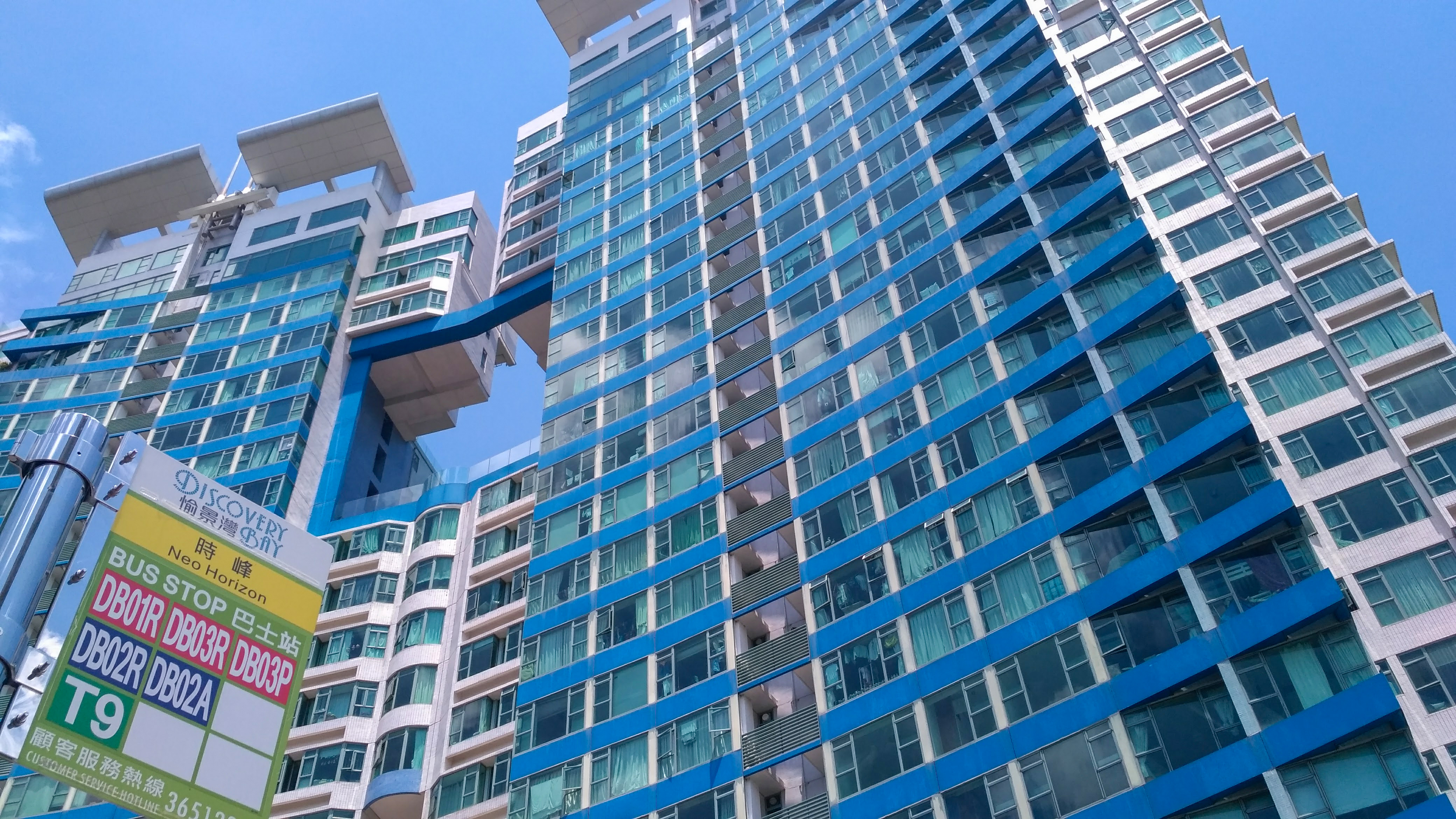
Neo Horizon, 2017

DB was developed in phases and the developer, HKR, envisages that DB will eventually be home to 25,000 residents. The following data applies as of April 2008:

Discovery Bay (by phases of development)
| Phase | Date | Development name(s) | Units | High-rise Units | Low-rise Units | Area |
|---|---|---|---|---|---|---|
| Phase 1: | 1982 | Beach Village, Headland Village & Parkridge Village | 504 | | | Tai Pak Wan |
| Phase 2: | 1985 September | Midvale Village | 381 | | | Tai Pak Wan |
| Phase 3: | 1986 June | Headland Village, Parkvale Village, Hillgrove Village & Parkridge Village | 800 | | | Tai Pak Wan |
| Phase 4: | 1998 June | Peninsula Village | 143 | | | Peninsula |
| Phase 5: | 1990 June | Greenvale Village | 1,344 | | | Yi Pak Wan |
| Phase 6: | 1991 September | DB Plaza | 144 | | | Tai Pak Wan |
| Phase 7: | 1994 September | La Vista & Bijou Hamlet | 238 | | | Tai Pak Wan |
| Phase 8: | 1995 May | La Costa | 319 | | | Tai Pak Wan |
| Phase 9: | 2000 May | La Serene | 181 | | | Tai Pak Wan |
| Phase 10: | 2000 January | Neo Horizon | 219 | | | Yi Pak Wan |
| Phase 11: | 2002 February | Siena One | 298 | | | Yi Pak Wan |
| Phase 12: | 2003 March | Siena Two | 757 | | | Yi Pak Wan |
| Phase 13: | 2007 December | Chianti | 520 | | | Yi Pak Wan |
| Phase 14: | 2011 March | AMALFI | 164 | | | Yi Pak Wan |
| Phase 15: | 2014 | Positano | 102 | | | Yi Pak Wan |

== Transportation ==
DB is connected the rest of Hong Kong via a road tunnel to the North Lantau Expressway and by a ferry service.

All services accept Hong Kong's Octopus card.

=== Ferries ===
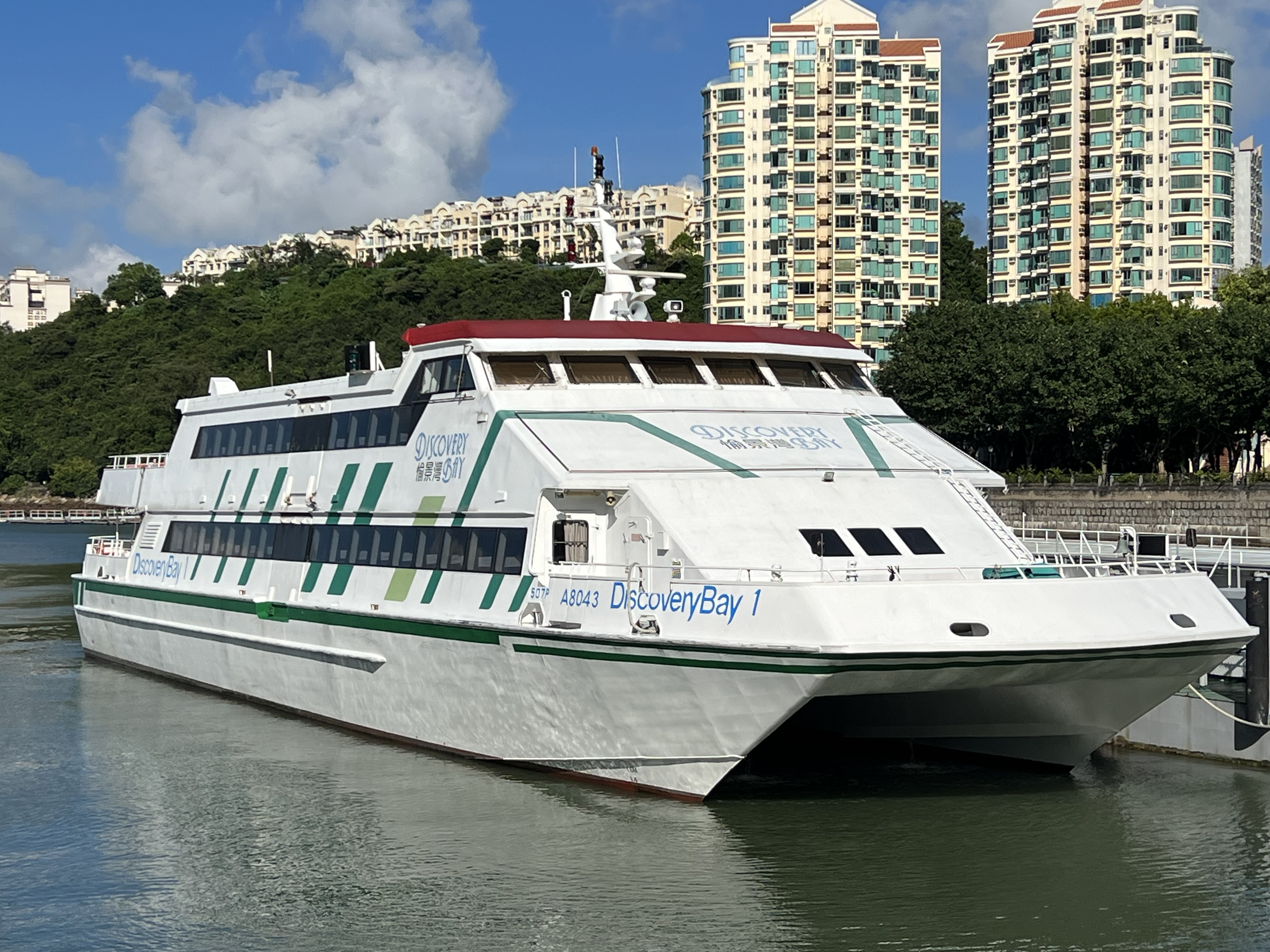
DB Ferry shuttles commuters between Discovery Bay and Central

There are 3 different ferry routes operating in Discovery Bay:

- A day time ferry service plies between DB Pier on Tai Pak Bay and Pier 3 in Central District on Hong Kong Island (journey time of approximately thirty minutes; frequency of around 15–30 minutes. Current ticket price, paid by Octopus Card, is HKD$46 for adults and HKD$23 for children for a single journey; If using a DB Resident's Octopus Card, the prices for adults and children / students will be HKD$33.5 and HKD$16.8 (regular services). Seniors can enjoy the HKD$2 scheme subsidised by the government. Since 2005, ferries have been equipped with free on-board Wi-Fi wireless broadband Internet, which is unique not only in Hong Kong but across Asia.
- Kai-to ferries operated by an independent operator link DB to nearby Peng Chau Island (via Trappist Haven Monastery) and Mui Wo, also on Lantau Island (journey time approximately 10 and 20 minutes respectively)

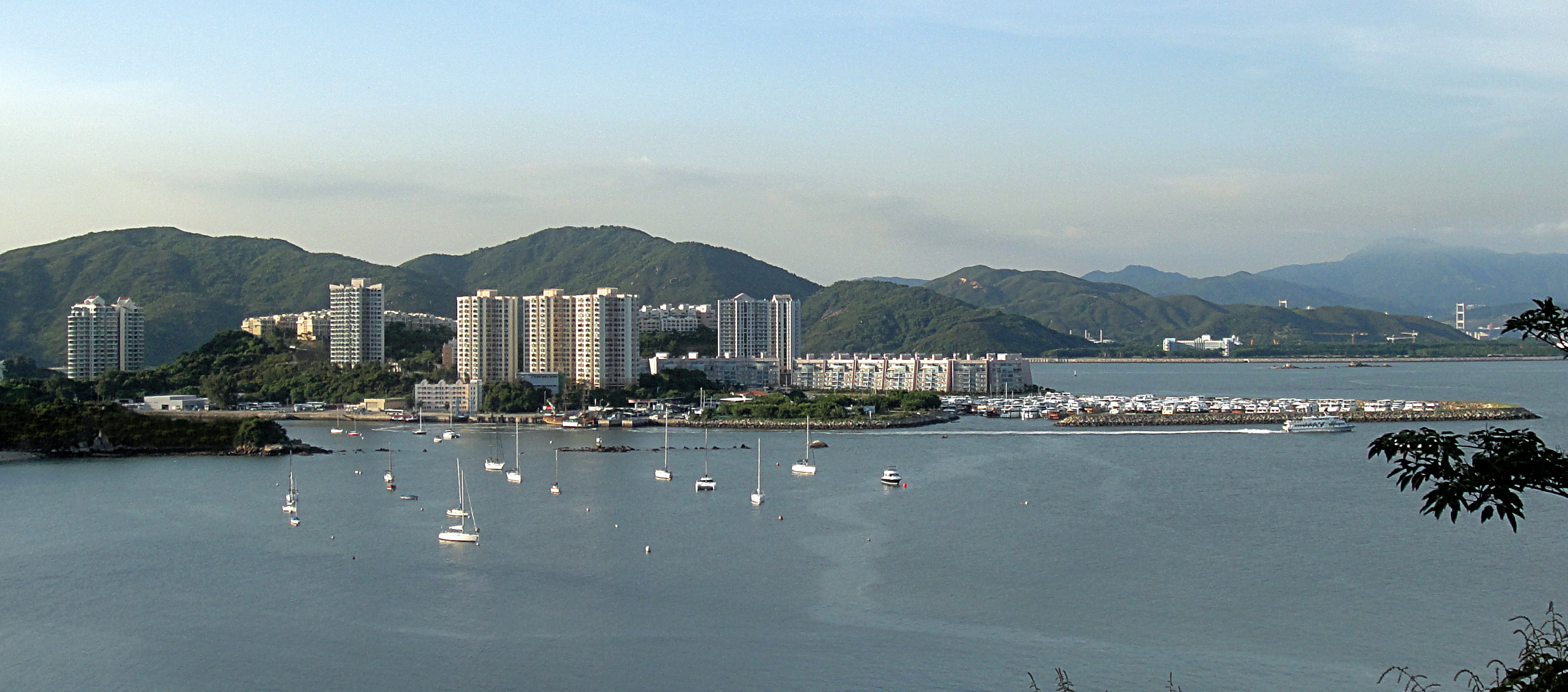
Discovery Bay Marina – a view from Nim Shue Wan village

There are 2 discount package provided by DBTPL. For plan A, there are total 1,550 stored points in transport card for adult at a price of HK$1,310 and 775 for child at a price of HK$655. For plan B, there are 930 stored points in the card for adult and 465 points for child. The prices are HK$858 and HK$429 respectively.

Ferries were the only way to reach Discovery Bay until the opening of the DB Tunnel in 2000 and remain the main way to reach DB from Central. The service is operated by Discovery Bay Transportation Services Ltd (DBTSL), a wholly owned subsidiary of HKR. The route between DB and Central is served by monohull and catamaran waterjets manufactured by Marinteknik in Singapore; seating 300 and 500 passengers respectively.

=== Buses ===
Commuting within DB is done via a 24-hour internal shuttle bus service operated by DBTSL, which runs between various parts of DB and the Bus Terminus by the DB Plaza/the ferry pier. Travelling between the various villages by bus requires a change at the DB Plaza Bus Terminus. The same applies for residents not living on a direct connection to the schools, churches and most of the clubs.

In 2000, a 2.4 km road tunnel linking DB to the North Lantau Expressway opened, enabling access to DB by road – and shortening the journey to other parts of Lantau, Kowloon and the New Territories. From the tunnel's inauguration, shuttle bus services ran to Tung Chung and the Hong Kong International Airport in Chek Lap Kok, and shortly after the opening of Hong Kong Disneyland and the Sunny Bay MTR station in June 2005, an additional route between Sunny Bay and DB was launched, further shortening the time to reach Kowloon and New Territories.

The five external bus are operated by Discovery Bay Transit Services Limited (DBTSL), another wholly owned subsidiary of HKRI:

- DB01R: From DB Plaza Bus Terminus to Tung Chung MTR station (journey time approximately 15–20 minutes; frequency of every 20 minutes during day time, every 10 minutes at peak hours)
- DB01A: From DB(N) Commercial Centre to Tung Chung MTR station (journey time approximately 15–20 minutes; frequency of every 60 minutes during day time, between 10AM to 8PM).
- DB01P: (*Special Service During School Days*) From Discovery College to Tung ChungMTR station via DB North Plaza and Siena Two (journey time approximately 15–20 minutes; This route only operates on school days of Discovery College, first running towards DB in the mornings at 7:30 and 7:45, and in the afternoons running towards Tung Chung at 3:35 and 3:45 respectively. T\
- DB02R: From DB Plaza Bus Terminus to Hong Kong International Airport in Chek Lap Kok (via Cathay City; journey time approximately 20–30 minutes; frequency of every 30 minutes during day time, every 60 minutes at midnight hours, 24-hour service)
- DB03R: From DB Plaza Bus Terminus to Sunny Bay MTR station (journey time approximately 15–20 minutes; frequency of every 20 minutes during day time, every 5–8 minutes at peak hours).
- DB03P: From DB(N) Commercial Centre to Sunny Bay MTR station (journey time approximately 15–20 minutes; frequency of every 30 minutes during day time, every 20 minutes at peak hours).
- DB08R: From No 28, Coastline to Central Ferry Pier 3. an overnight ferry replacement service. 5 buses from 00:15 to 05:00 with the ferry restarting at 06:30. Journey time approximately 60 minutes.

Internal and External Bus Services
| Route no. | Start dest. | End dest. | Fare |
|---|---|---|---|
| GC | DB Plaza Bus Terminus | Discovery Bay Golf Club | Free for Golf Club members |
| 1 | DB Plaza Bus Terminus | Headland Drive / Parkland Drive | $6.2 ($5.1 for Residents) |
| 1/6 | DB Plaza Bus Terminus | Headland Drive / Parkland Drive / Seabee Lane | $6.2 ($5.1 for Residents) |
| 2 and 3 | DB Plaza Bus Terminus | Midvale/Parkvale | $6.2 ($5.1 for Residents) |
| 4 | Coastline Villa | DB North | $6.2 ($5.1 for Residents) |
| 4A | DB North | Coastline | $6.2 ($5.1 for Residents) |
| 5 | DB Plaza Bus Terminus | La Serene | $6.2 ($5.1 for Residents) |
| 6 | DB Plaza Bus Terminus | Seabee Lane | $6.2 ($5.1 for Residents) |
| 9 | Caperidge Drive | Chianti (Pavilion) | $6.2 ($5.1 for Residents) |
| 9A | Chianti (Pavilion) | Caperidge Drive | $6.2 ($5.1 for Residents) |
| 18 | DB Plaza Bus Terminus | IL PICCO House 25 | $6.2 ($5.1 for Residents) |
| DB01R | DB Plaza Bus Terminus | Tung Chung Station Bus Terminus | / Adult / Senior / Child; Non-Resident / $14.3 / $7.2 / $7.2; Resident / $11.6 / $5.8 / $5.8 |
| DB01A | DB North Plaza | Tung Chung Station Bus Terminus | / Adult / Senior / Child; Non-Resident / $14.3 / $7.2 / $7.2; Resident / $11.6 / $5.8 / $5.8 |
| DB01P (School Days Only) | Discovery College | Tung Chung Station Bus Terminus | / Adult / Senior / Child; Non-Resident / $14.3 / $7.2 / $7.2; Resident / $11.6 / $5.8 / $5.8 |
| DB02R | DB Plaza Bus Terminus | Airport (New Coach Station) | $48 ($40.6 for Residents) |
| DB03P | DB North | Sunny Bay Public Transport Interchange | / Adult / Senior / Child; Non-Resident / $14.3 / $7.2 / $7.2; Resident / $11.6 / $5.8 / $5.8 |
| DB03R | DB Plaza Bus Terminus | Sunny Bay Public Transport Interchange | / Adult / Senior / Child; Non-Resident / $14.3 / $7.2 / $7.2; Resident / $11.6 / $5.8 / $5.8 |
| DB08R | No 28, Coastline Villa | Central Pier 3 | / Adult / Senior / Child; Non-Resident / $58 / $2 / $29; Resident / $41.7 / $2 / $20.9 |

==== Separate night buses ====
- N3/2 – DB Plaza Bus Terminus <> Midvale / Parkvale
- N3/2/7/8 – DB Plaza Bus Terminus <> Midvale / Parkvale / Caperidge / Capevale / Coastline / Capeland
- N5/1/6 – DB Plaza Bus Terminus <> La Serene / Parkland / Headland / Seabee
- N7/8 – DB Plaza Bus Terminus <> Capridge / Capevale / Coastline / Capeland

=== Private transport ===
Private cars not permitted to enter the area, with a few exceptions for certain agents of the developer, local businesses or for emergency needs and Taxis are only allowed in DB North.

Golf carts are a common mode of transportation for residents within Discovery Bay, however exiting the resort town in a golf cart is not allowed. The number of golf carts is restricted by Hong Kong Transport Department to 500. This has contributed to the exuberant prices of the vehicle, with some buggies selling for more than $2 million HKD.

The presence of golf carts (with a much slower maximum speed than normal private cars) creates a safer road environment than many other places in Hong Kong, especially compared with the road traffic density in other parts of the territory. As such, DB has gained a reputation for its child and pet-friendly environment. Most golf carts run on petrol, however electric models are being introduced.

Residents can also use the hire car service which is operates as a point-to-point minibus shuttle service (e.g. operating on a basis similar to SuperShuttle airport services in the United States). This service only operates within Discovery Bay.

Motorised scooters have gained popularity in recent years, particularly amongst teenagers.

== Education ==
A number of schools and colleges operate in Discovery Bay, ranging from kindergartens to secondary schools. This ranges from government-subsidised to private schools.

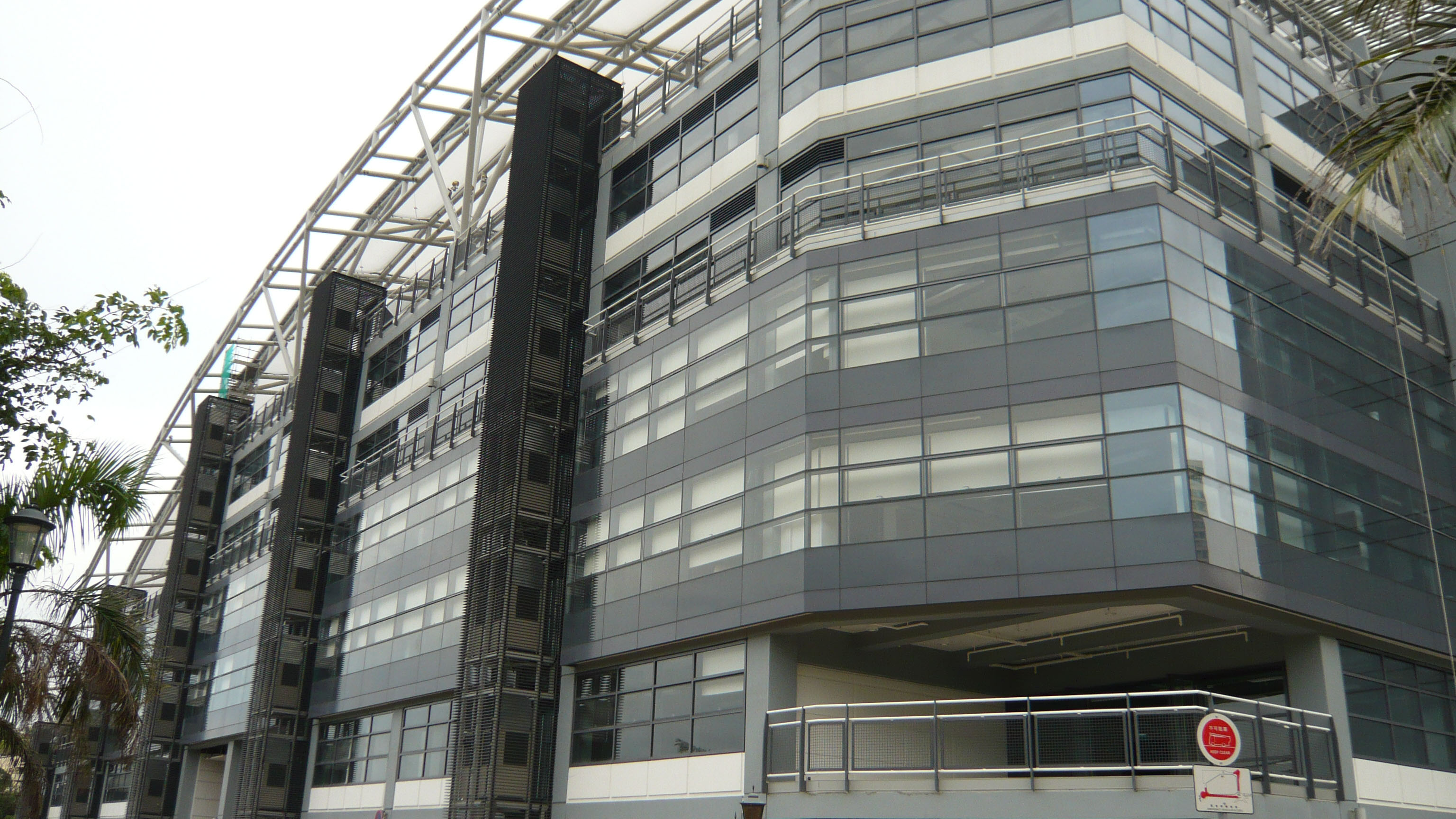
Discovery College

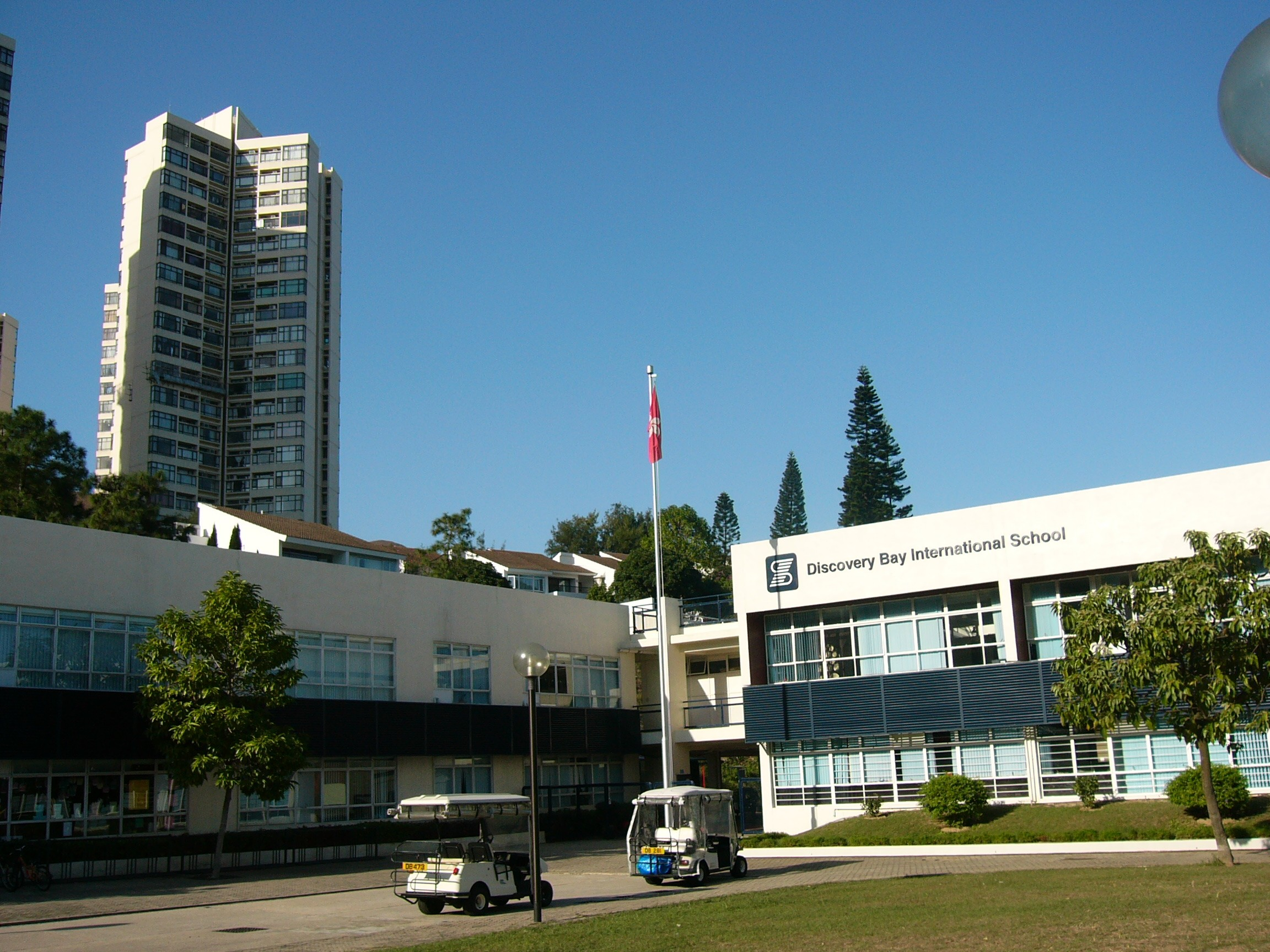
Discovery Bay International School

Discovery Bay is in Primary One Admission (POA) School Net 99, which contains two aided schools: SKH Wei Lun Primary School (聖公會偉倫小學) in Discovery Bay and Holy Family School (聖家學校) in Peng Chau; no government primary schools are in this net.

Schools located within Discovery Bay include

- Discovery Montessori Academy (DMA) offers an IB Montessori education curriculum for children aged 3-12 years old. It is the first IB Montessori accredited school in Hong Kong and Asia.
- Discovery Bay International School (DBIS), built by the developer in 1983. It is an English-language private international kindergarten, primary and early secondary school providing education from nursery to Year 13.
- Discovery College, a primary and secondary 'through-train' school set up under the government's Private Independent Schools scheme. The college opened for the 2008–2009 academic year, currently operating from Year 1 to Year 13.
- SKH Wei Lun Primary School, a Chinese-language government-aided Anglican primary school providing education from Year 1 to Year 6.
- Discovery Mind Primary School, opened in 2012, provided private primary education.
- L'Ecole Pierre et Marie Curie Education Centre, a French school, offering programmes in French, English and Mandarin, for Year 1 to Year 6 students.

Nursery and kindergartens operating within Discovery Bay include

- Discovery Montessori School (DMS): Located in the North Plaza Unit 101, DMS has earned a strong reputation among families in the area for providing high-quality Montessori education for children aged 1-6 years old.
- Discovery Bay International School (DBIS) Kindergarten, an English-language private international kindergarten;
- Discovery Mind Kindergarten (DMK), a private kindergarten operating Chinese and English sessions;
- Sunshine House, an English language private international kindergarten; and
- La Petite Enfance Kindergarten, a French-language private international kindergarten.

There are a number of parents that send their children to the schools in Hong Kong Island, Tung Chung and the Kwai Tsing District.

A further site has been earmarked for the development of a Catholic 'through train' school. However, as of August 2009, this is still at the proposed stage.

== Municipal services ==
DB is owned and developed by HKR International Limited (HKRI). Discovery Bay Services Management Limited (DBSML), a subsidiary of HKRI, manages the development. DB used to have its own private water supply from a reservoir and water treatment plant located near the golf course in the mountain valley above the estate. Since DB Tunnel opened in 2000, DB has been connected to the municipal supply from the Water Supplies Department which sources its water both from reservoirs throughout Hong Kong, Lantau Island and the New Territories and from the Pearl River Delta in the mainland. Current municipal facilities inside DB include a fire station and ambulance depot, a post office and a police reporting post. These facilities were built by the developer and services rendered by various government bodies.

With the opening of the DB Tunnel in 2000, the Government deemed the police station and fire station/ambulance depot unnecessary, and DB relies on services provided by the headquarters in Tung Chung. A Community Centre has also been built at the Yi Pak Bay, and it should have been handed over to and operated by the Government in 2009.

== Issues and criticisms ==
=== Discovery Bay Marina Club 2018 ===
On 31 August 2018 the Discovery Bay Marina Club (DBMC) gave notice to all 200+ boat owners to vacate the marina permanently by 31 December 2018 for renovations. The majority of these boats were live-a-boards, used by families. The DBMC offered no time line for the renovations or indication that the boats would be allowed to return. A public campaign was started to have the HKRI reverse their decision.

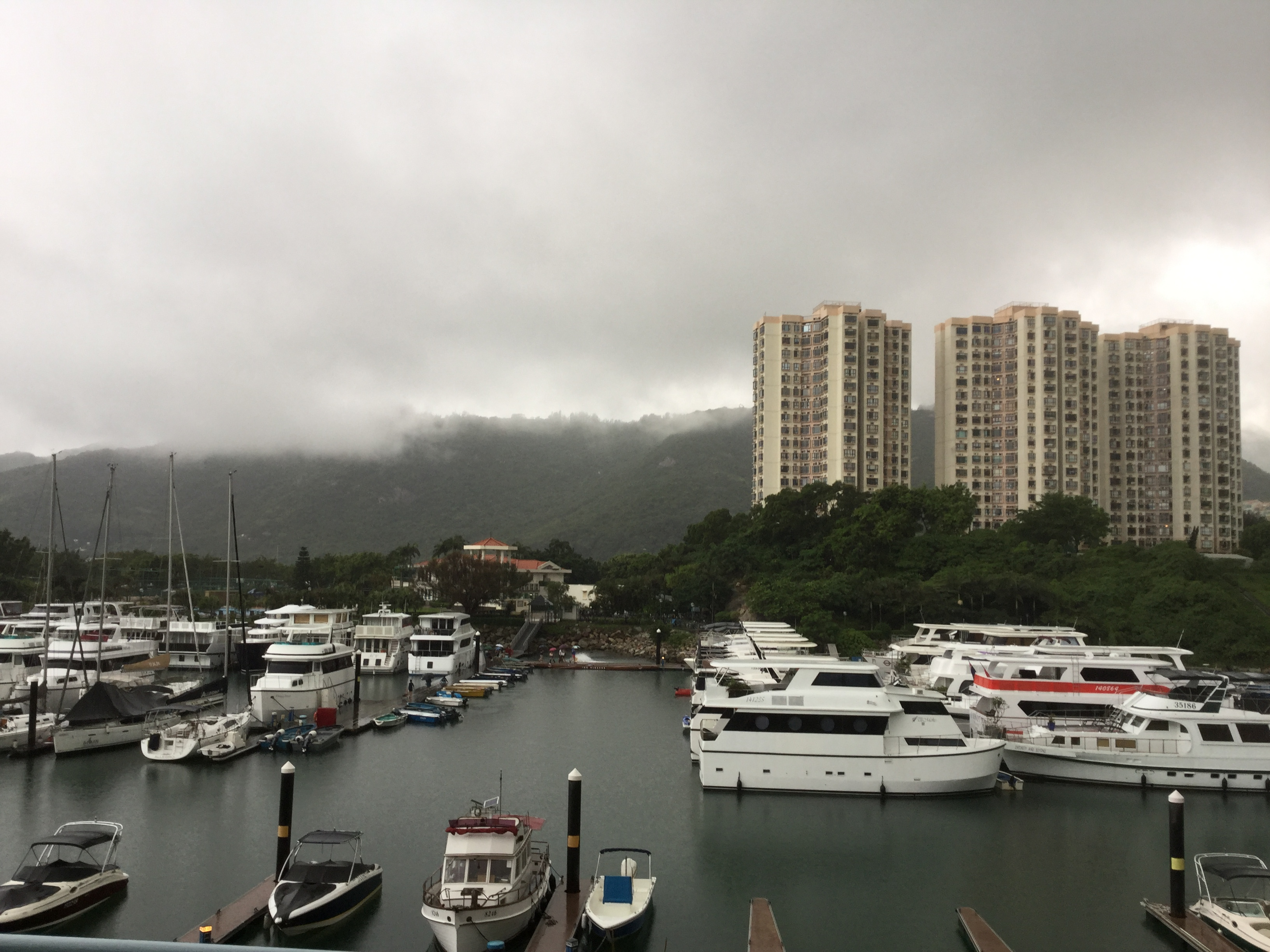
DBMC before houseboat owners were told to vacate the marina

Many families went into debt as their 'house boats' became worthless overnight. The DBMC, rebranded as Lantau Yacht Club, was transformed from the family and community friendly club to an exclusive members-only yacht club.

== See also ==
- Lo Fu Tau
- List of areas of Hong Kong
- List of buildings and structures in Hong Kong
