= Tai Ho Wan =

Bay of Hong Kong

Coordinates: 22.299266°N 113.978260°E

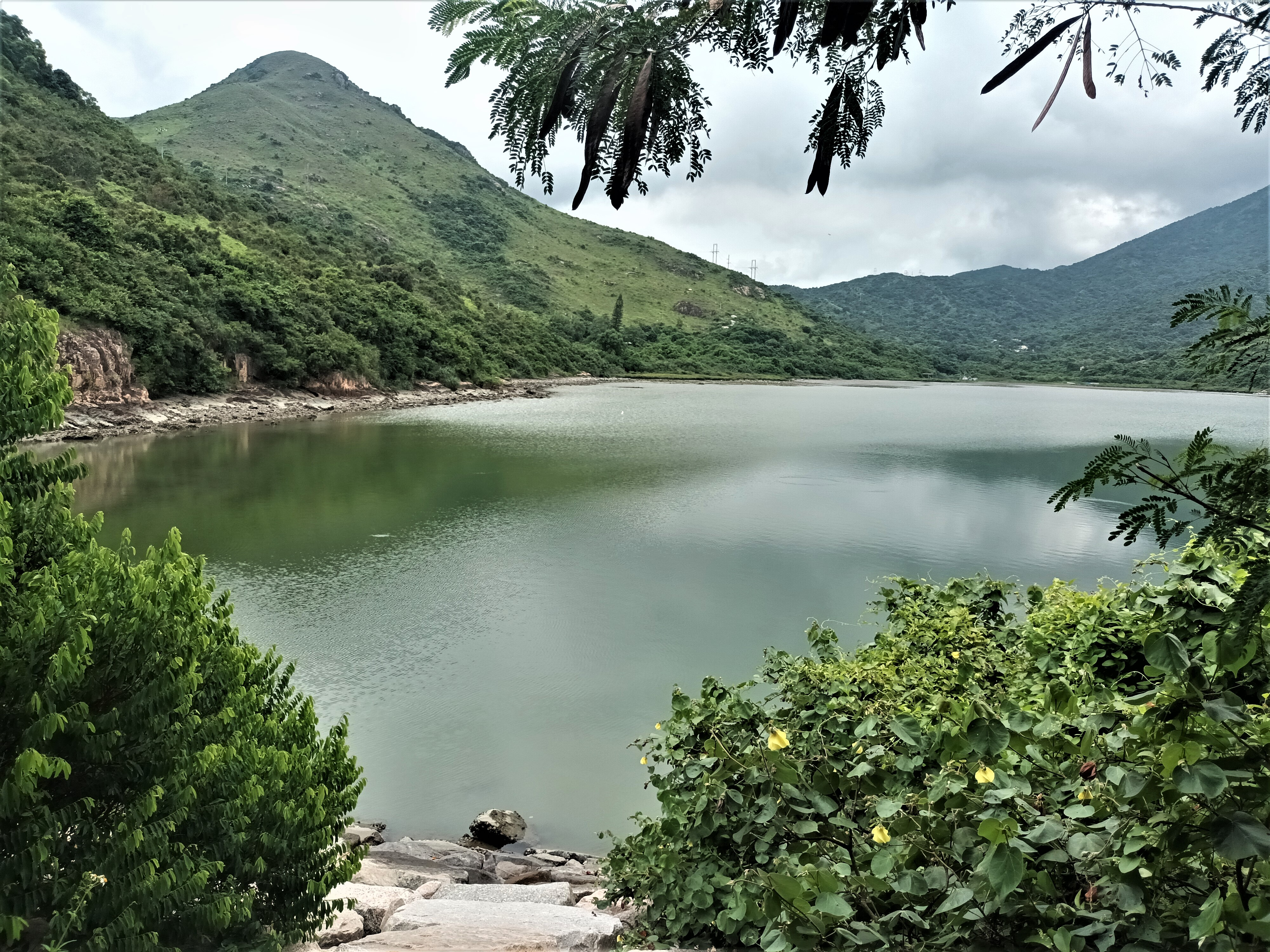
View of Tai Ho Wan from the eastern end of the northern shore of the bay.

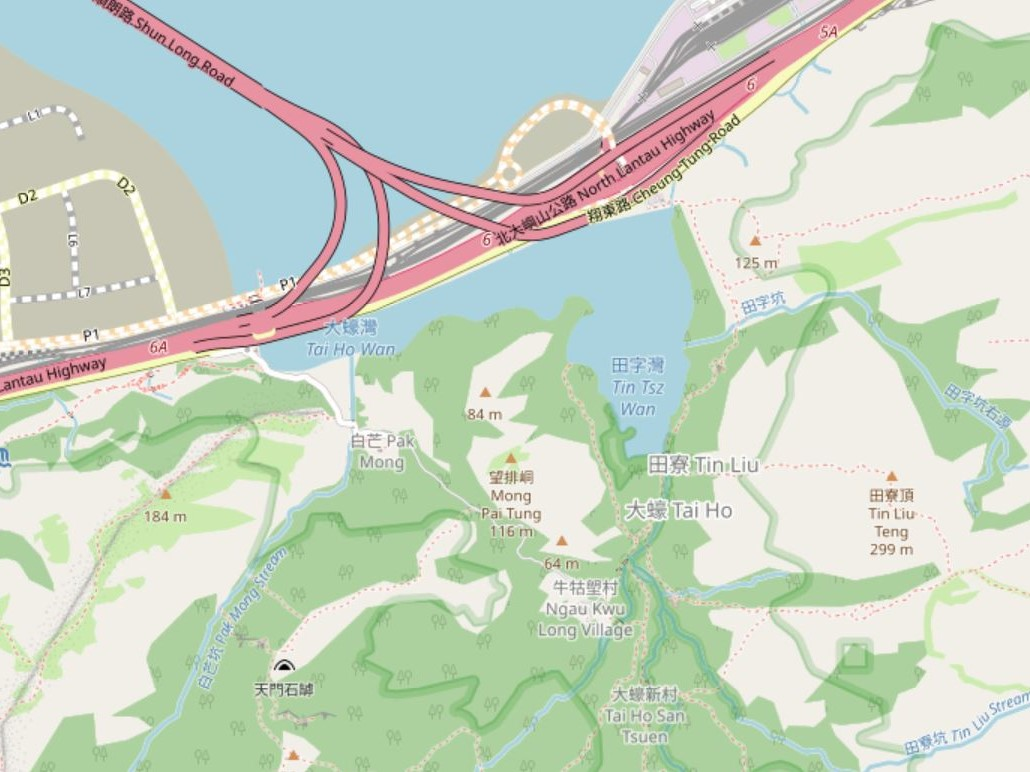
Map of Tai Ho Wan and surrounding area as of 2023.

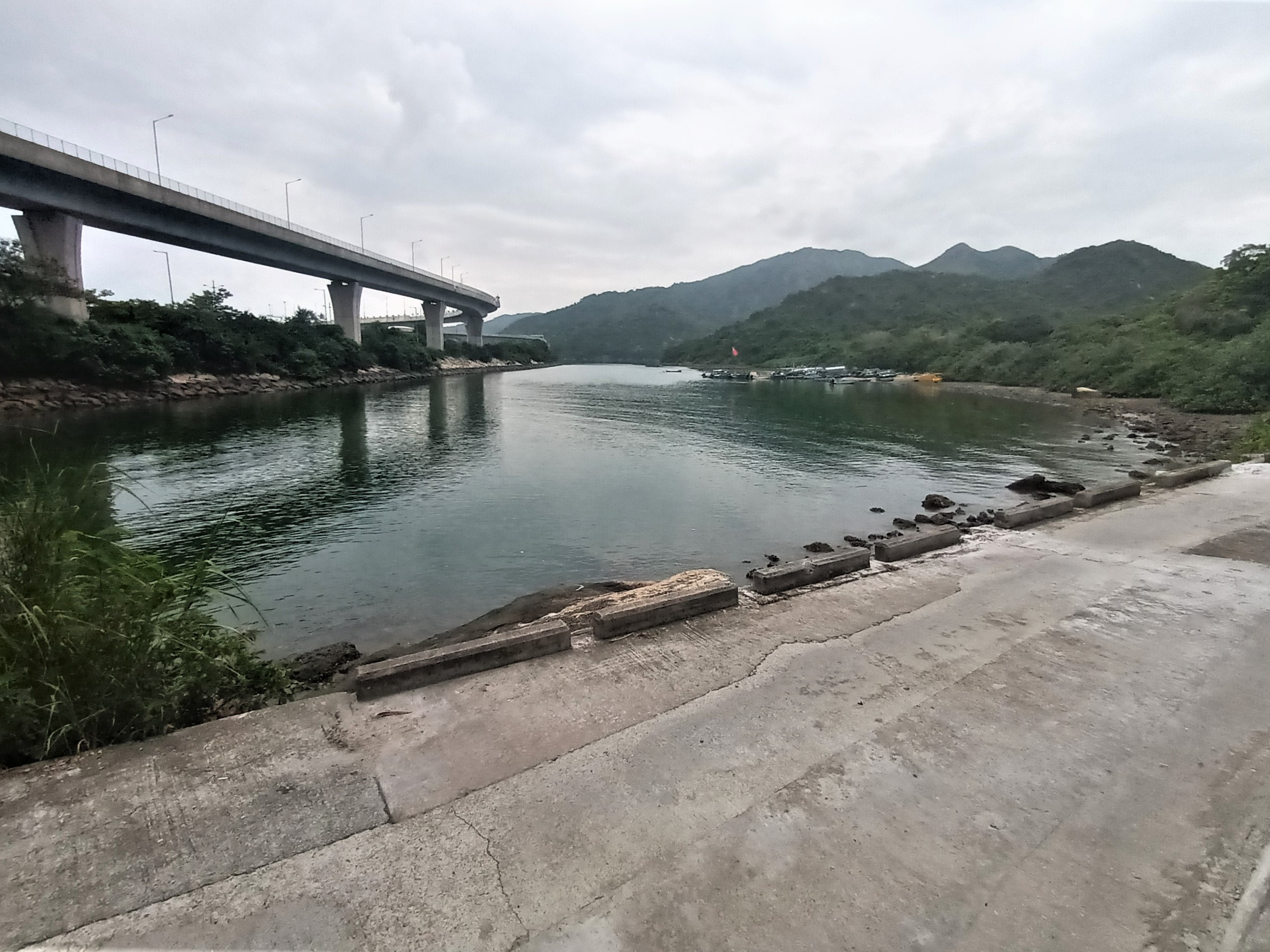
View of Tai Ho Wan from the western end of the bay. The bridge carries Shun Long Road (順朗路), connecting to North Lantau Highway.

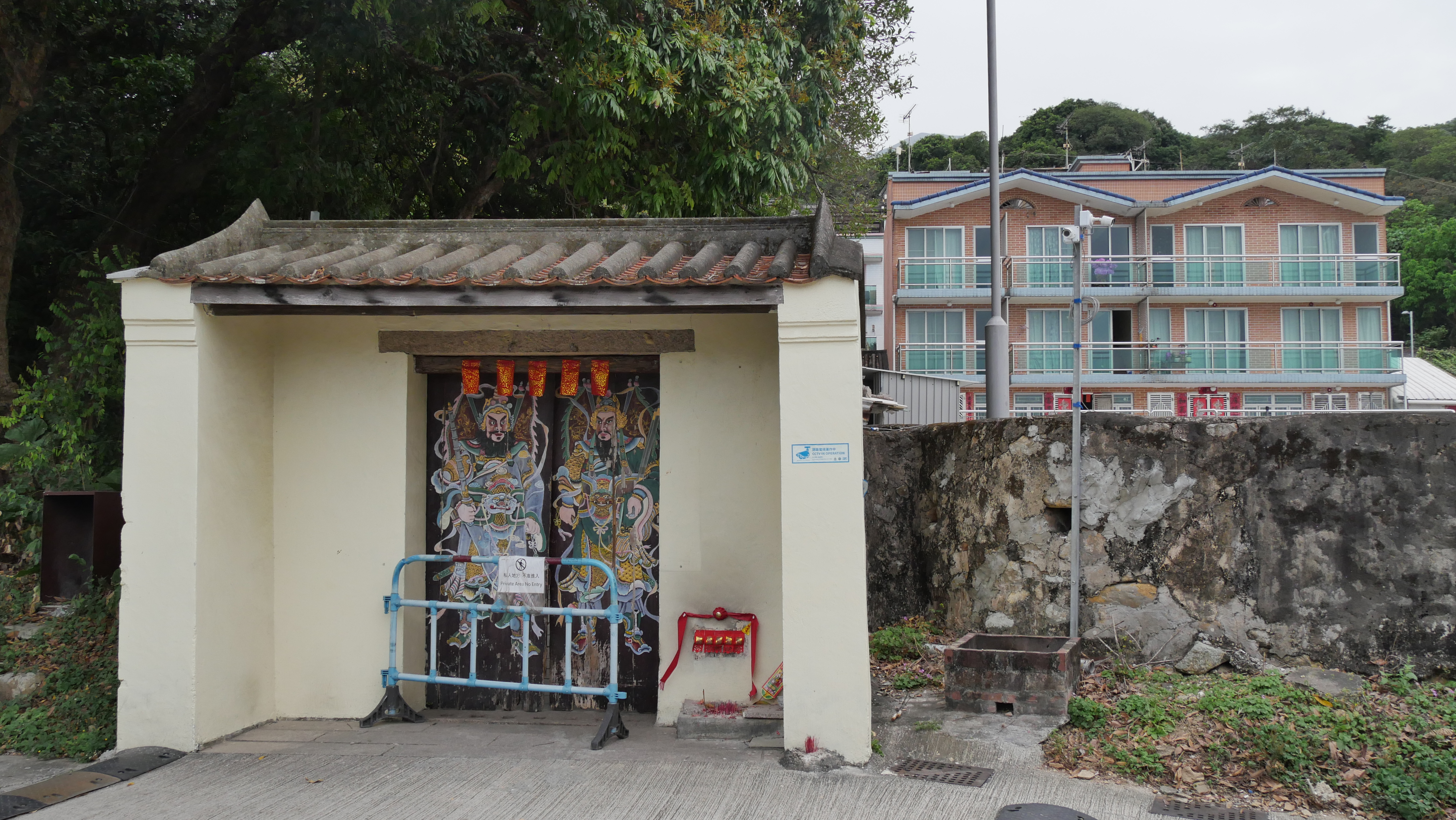
Entrance gate of Pak Mong.

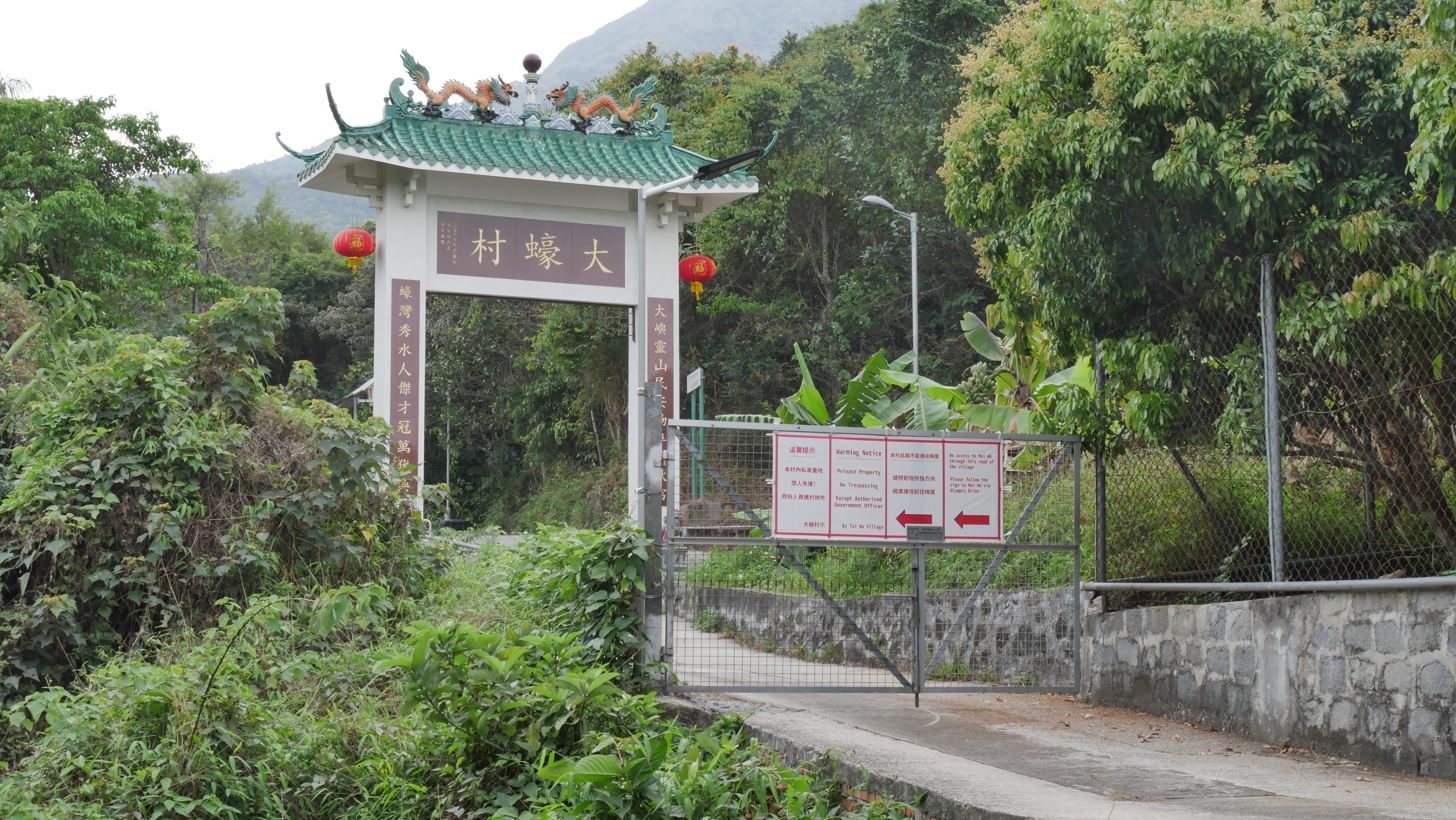
Paifang of Tai Ho Village and metal gate blocking the road in 2021.

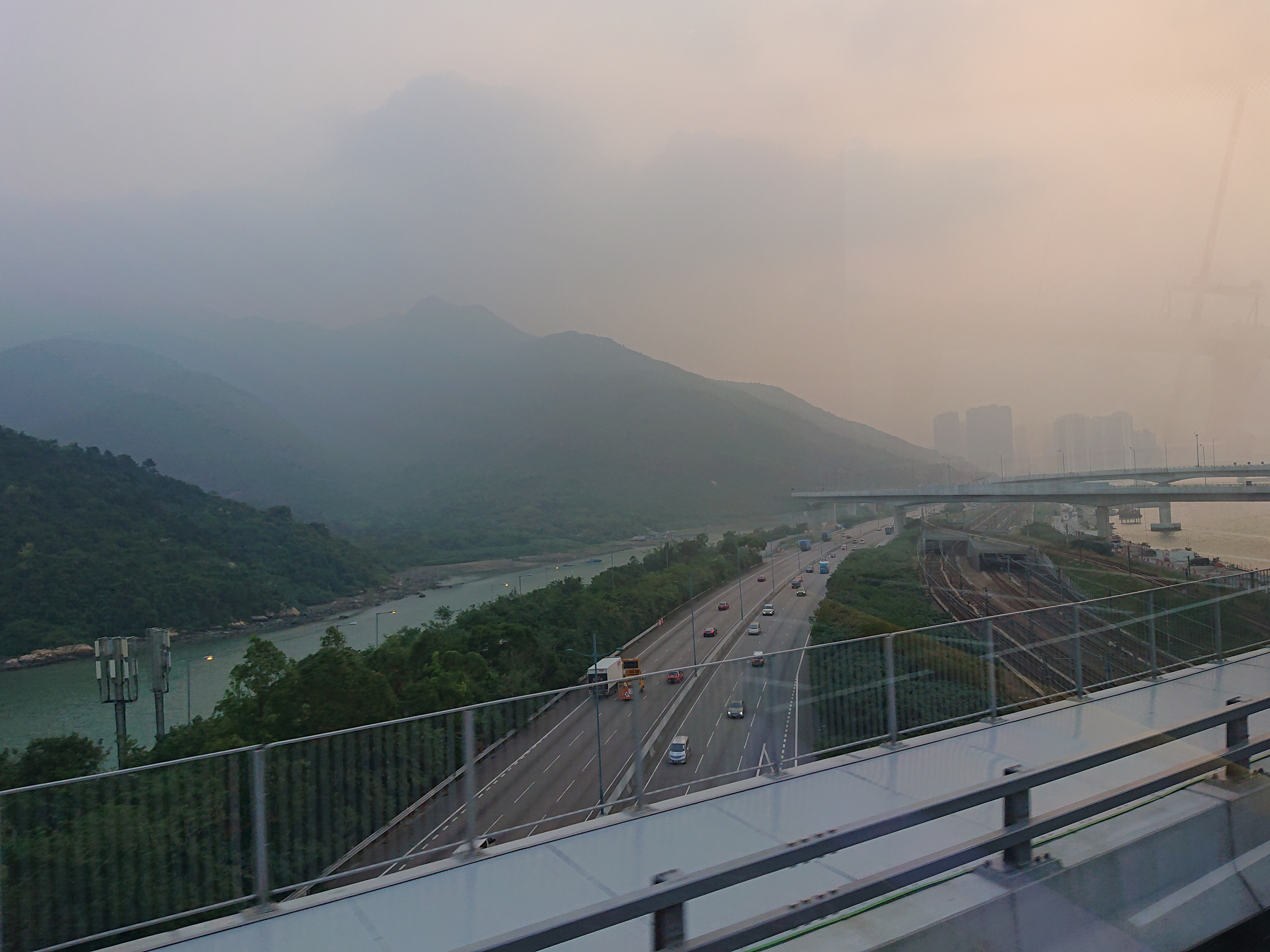
Interchanges between North Lantau Highway and Shun Long Road at Tai Ho Wan.

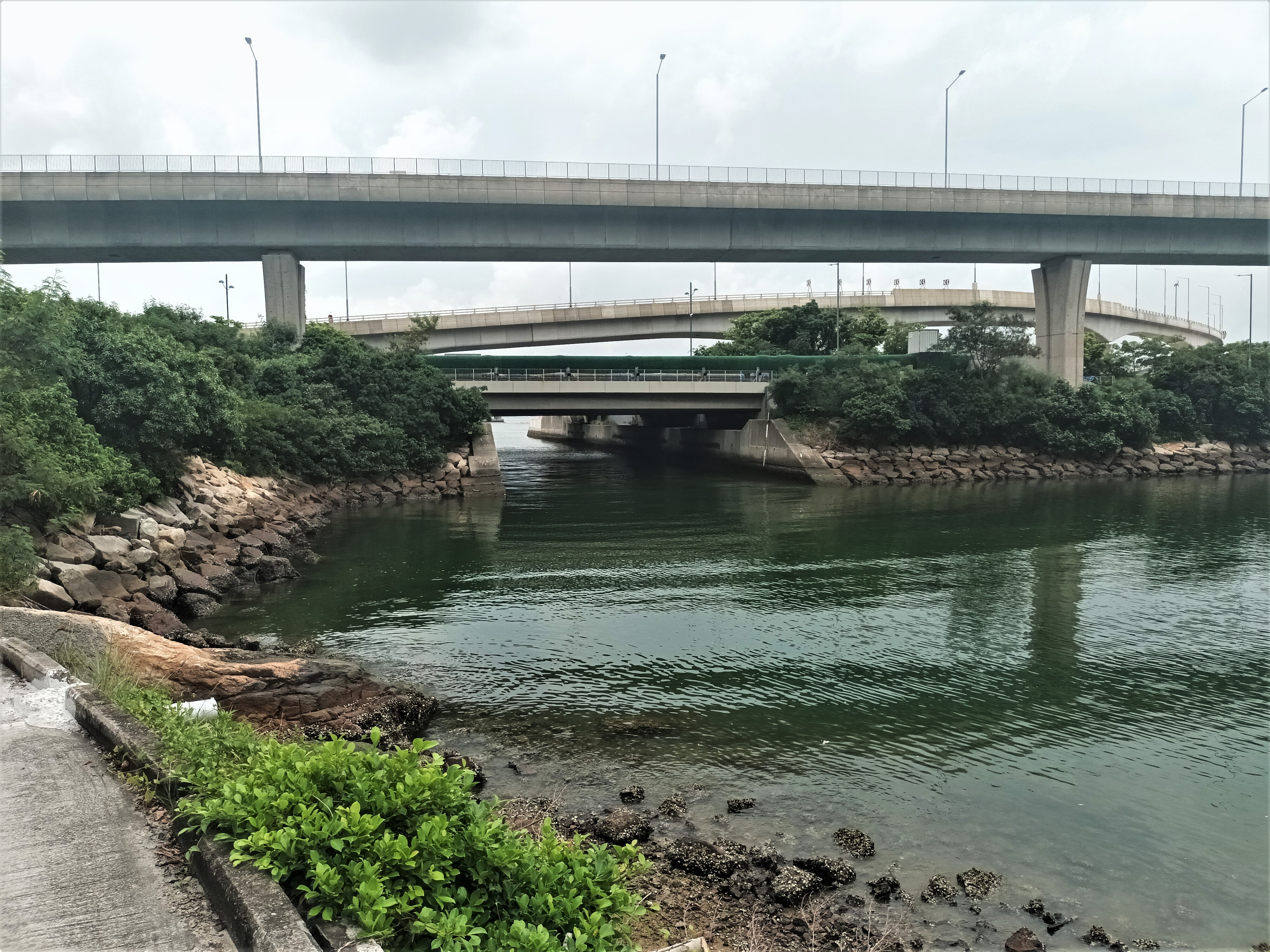
Channel at the western end of Tai Ho Wan, connecting the bay to the South China Sea. The visible bridges crossing the channel carry Shun Long Road, Cheung Tung Road and the North Lantau Highway.

Tai Ho Wan or Tai Ho Bay (Chinese: 大蠔灣; Cantonese Yale: daaih hòh wāan; lit. 'big oyster bay', also 大濠灣; 'big inlet bay') is a bay on the north shore of Lantau Island in the New Territories of Hong Kong. It is located west of Siu Ho Wan, and northeast of Tung Chung and Kei Tau Kok. The surrounding land was originally planned to be part of the North Lantau New Town scope, but there is a current slowdown in its plans because of the lack in population growth and environmental groups opposed to the next in abeyance.

Tai Ho was originally a rural area. To the northern part there is a shoal extend and to the southern part is the foot of Lin Fa Shan. Slopes are covered with grassland and shrub forests. There are monsoonal nature of swamps, as well as a stream named Tai Ho Stream which flows into the Tai Ho Bay.

== Villages ==
Villages in the area include Pak Mong, Ngau Kwu Long, Tai Ho Village a.k.a. Tai Ho Tsuen (大蠔村), Tai Ho New Village a.k.a. Tai Ho San Tsuen (大蠔新村) and Tin Liu (田寮). At the time of the 2011 Census, the population of the area was about 150 persons.

Pak Mong, Ngau Kwu Long and Tai Ho are recognized villages under the New Territories Small House Policy. The three villages historically formed the San Heung (三鄉) community.

== History ==
In 1989, the British Hong Kong Government announced that the Airport Core Programme, which includes the north through the Tai Ho, North Lantau Highway, and the development of Tai Ho into new towns. The plans for the Tung Chung line was released at this time which also called for the construction of a Tai Ho station. However, in the late 1990s, due to the slow down in the development of Tung Chung, the expected slow down in population growth, coupled with environmental concerns that the development of Tai Ho will affect the local environment and ecology, large-scale construction is still under review.

A part of the bay and a stream flowing into it were designated as a Site of Special Scientific Interest in 1999.

Private property developers Sun Hung Kai and Swire Properties have stated in 2000 having started purchasing land in the area "many years ago". It was reported in 2014 that about 70 per cent of private land in the Tai Ho area had been sold to developers, the majority of it being owned by Sun Hung Kai Properties. Villagers have protested against some aspects of the environmental protection plans of the area, which might constrain their right to farm and build small houses. Protests involved the blocking of private roads and footpaths leading to the bay, as well as the destruction of mangrove in 2014.

== Nature ==
Tai Ho Stream (大蠔河) runs past Tin Liu, Tai Ho San Tsuen and Ngau Kwu Long to Tai Ho Wan. It has been reported as the stream supporting the greatest diversity of freshwater fish and brackish water fish in Hong Kong, with 68 species recorded. In 1999, the Hong Kong Government designated Tai Ho Stream as the 63rd Site of Special Scientific Interest (SSSI) due to the discovery of the Ayu (Plecoglossus altivelis) in the river, which cannot be found anywhere in the world except for waters in Hokkaidō, and Hong Kong. Other freshwater fish species recorded include Anguilla marmorata, A. japonica, Awaous melanocephalus and Pisodonophis boro. The SSSI covers an area of about 5 hectares that includes Tai Ho Stream and several tributaries, as well as the southern end of Tai Ho Bay, featuring mangrove and seagrass.

Other species that have been recorded in the area include Horseshoe crabs, that are commonly found in the Halophila beccarii seagrass beds of Tai Ho Wan, tokay gecko (Gekko gecko), rare or uncommon butterflies including red lacewing (Cethosia biblis) and amphibian species including Romer's tree frog (Liuixalus romeri) and short-legged toad (Megophrys brachykolos).

== Infrastructure ==
Tai Ho Wan was partially reclaimed in the 1990s. It is now crossed by the North Lantau Highway, Cheung Tung Road, the Airport Express and the Tung Chung line of the MTR. The land reclamation is also the site of the interchanges between North Lantau Highway and Shun Long Road (順朗路), part of the Tuen Mun–Chek Lap Kok Link.

== Other features ==
A site in Pak Mong and a site in Tai Ho Village have been listed as a Sites of Archaeological Interest.

The area features three graded historic structures: the watchtower of Pak Mong (Grade II), the watchtower of Tai Ho (Grade III) and the Entrance Gate of Pak Mong (Grade III).
