= Tsing Ma Control Area =

Hong Kong highway management area

Tsing Ma Control Area (Chinese: 青馬管制區; TMCA) is an area covering Lantau Link and related road networks in the New Territories, Hong Kong, including Tsing Ma Bridge, Kap Shui Mun Bridge, Ma Wan Viaduct (all part of the Lantau Link), Cheung Tsing Highway, Cheung Tsing Tunnel, Cheung Tsing Bridge (Cheung Tsing Tunnel and Cheung Tsing Bridge form part of Tsing Kwai Highway), Ting Kau Bridge (belongs to Tsing Long Highway, a part of Route 3), North West Tsing Yi Interchange (also belongs at Route 3), Tsing Kwai Highway and North Lantau Highway, but excluding the area of rails managed by the MTRCL.

The area spans on 17 kilometres (11 mi) of road network on Tsing Yi Island, Ma Wan, Lantau Island and Kwai Chung. Extra traffic regulations are enforced in the area.

The area is currently managed and maintained by the Tsing Ma Management Limited. One of its incomes is collecting toll and fee of Lantau Link at Lantau Toll Plaza.

TMCA maintains two double-ended wide-body ambulances, dispatched in the event of a major traffic accident. They were converted from retired Neoplan Airliner N 922-2 airport buses.

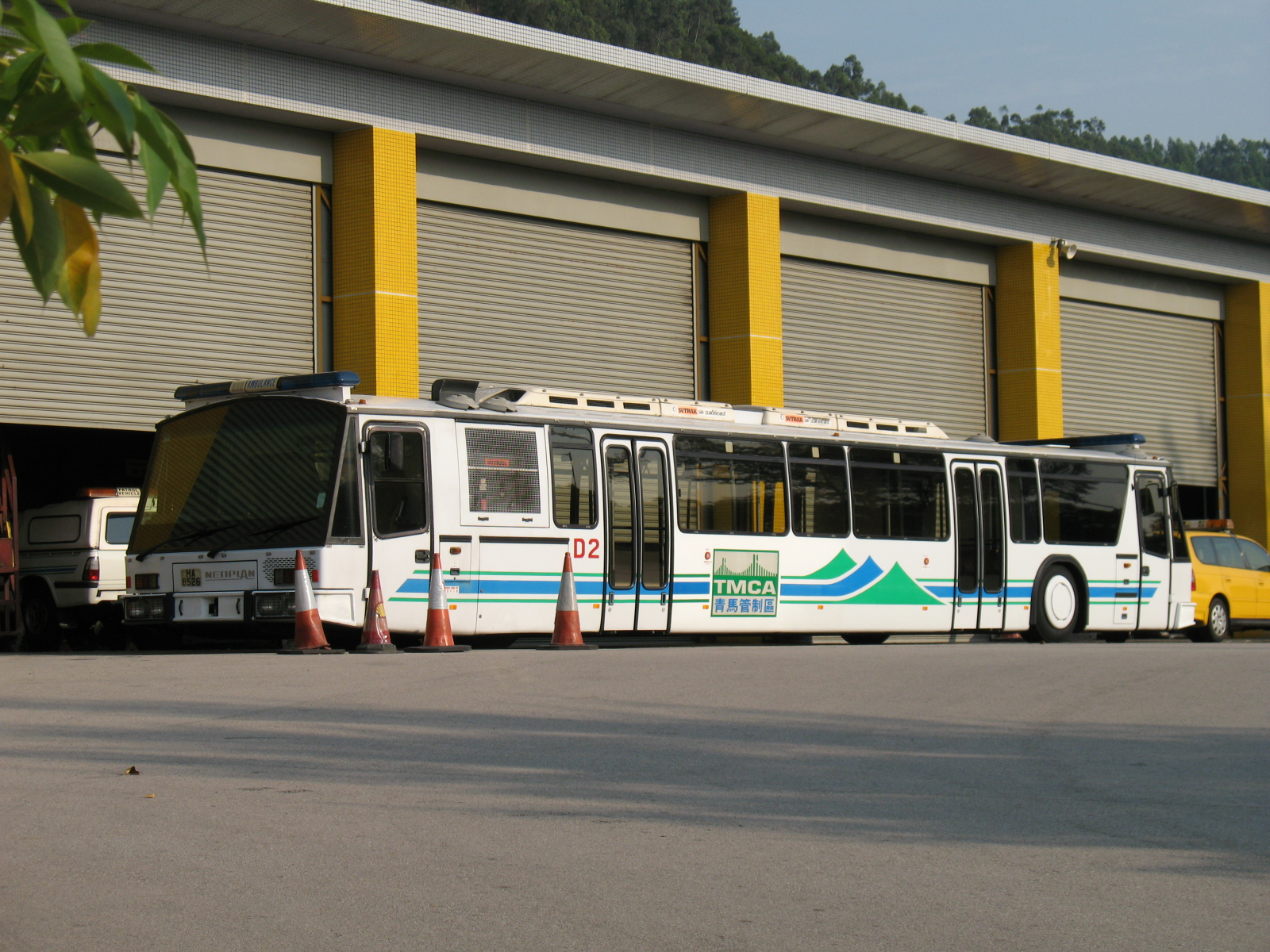
TMCA double-ended, wide-body super ambulance
