= Tsing Yi North Coastal Road =

Dual carriageway in Tsing Yi, Hong Kong

Tsing Yi North Coastal Road 青衣北岸公路 Tsing Yi North Coastal Road
- Road highlighted in blue

Route information
- Length: 2.2 km (1.4 mi)
- Existed: 2 February 2002–present
- History: Construction began in February 1999

Major junctions
- East end: Tsing Tsuen Road in Tsing Yi
- West end: Route 3 / Route 8 near Shek Wan

Location
- Country: China
- Special administrative region: Hong Kong
- Districts: Kwai Tsing

Highway system
- Transport in Hong Kong; Routes; Roads and Streets

Tsing Yi North Coastal Road
- Traditional Chinese: 青衣北岸公路
Transcriptions
Yue: Cantonese
- Yale Romanization: Chīng yī bāk ngohn gūng louh
- Jyutping: Cing1 ji1 bak1 ngon6 gung1 lou6

The Tsing Yi North Coastal Road (Chinese: 青衣北岸公路; Jyutping: cing1 ji1 bak1 ngon6 gung1 lou6), also abbreviated as TYNCR, is a dual carriageway in Tsing Yi, Hong Kong. The road starts at Tsing Tsuen Road, where it travels through the northern part of the island before ending at Route 3 and Route 8 on the western side of the island at a left-in/left-out interchange, 2.2 kilometres (1.4 mi) from its eastern terminus. The road was first planned in 1998 to relieve traffic coming from Lantau. Construction began in February 1999, and the road was opened on 2 February 2002.

== Description ==
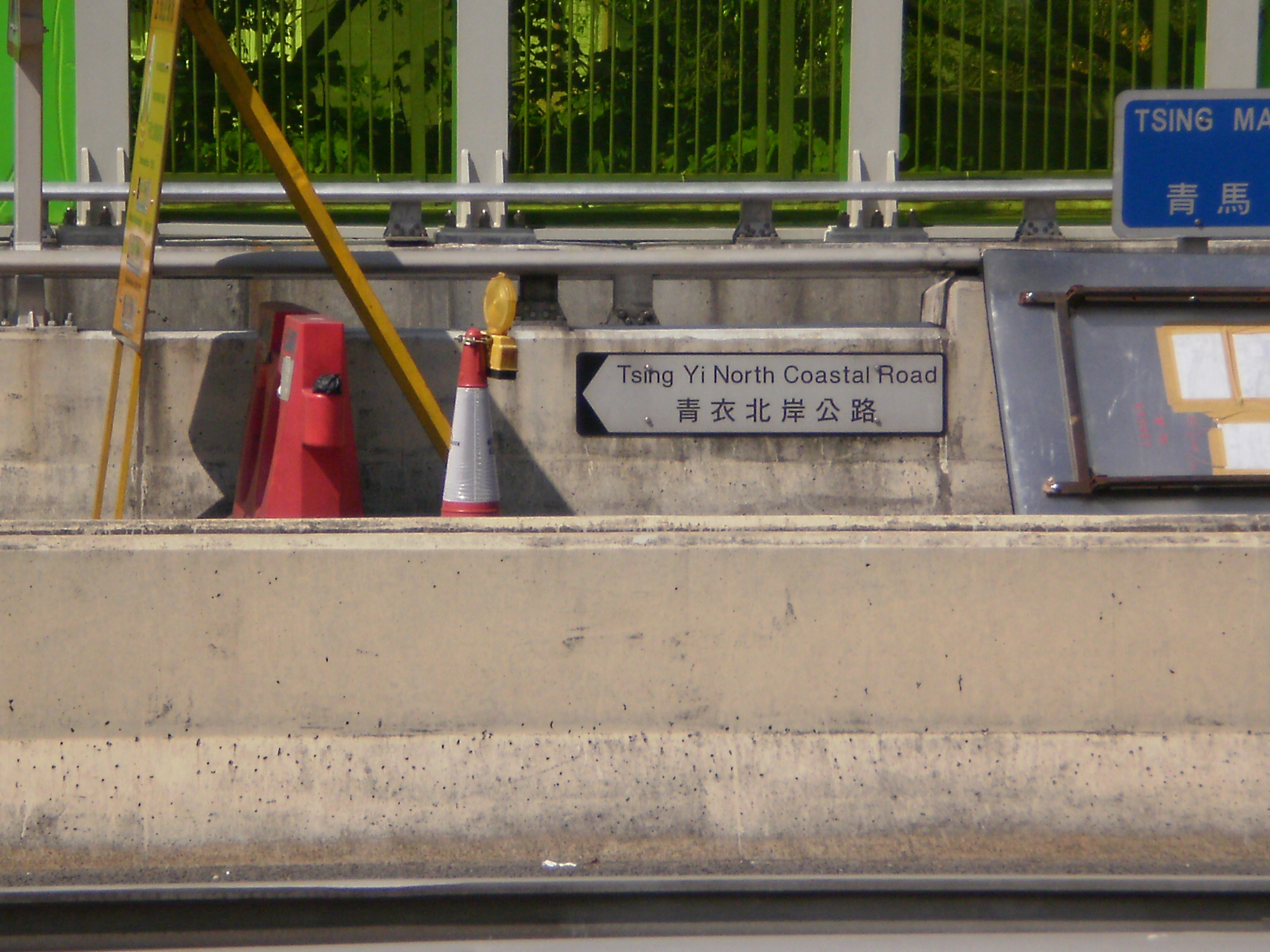
Street name sign of the road in Tsing Yi in September 2009

The road starts at the border of the Tsing Ma Control Area, on the eastern exit ramps of the Tam Kon Shan Interchange and the western terminus of Tsing Tsuen Road. The road travels westward, with ramps reemerging from the interchange, which is surrounded by noise barriers. TYNCR then travels across multiple viaducts on the northern side of Tsing Yi, with hills south of the road, and the coastline north of it. About 1.4 kilometres (0.87 mi) from the eastern terminus, TYNCR travels to Tam Kon Shan Road, near a shipyard and a cement factory. The exit ramp is accessible from westbound lanes, and the entrance ramp from Tam Kon Shan Road to eastbound lanes. The road continues eastward and ends at a left-in/left-out intersection, located east of the Lantau Link Visitors Centre. The interchange then connects to Routes 3 and 8.

In 2018, 23,440 vehicles travelled the part of the road between Tam Kon Shan Interchange West End and the slip roads to and from Tam Kon Shan Road which is classified as a Primary Distributor (PD) by the Transport Department, while 14,400 vehicles travelled the part of the road between Tsing Tsuen Road and Tam Kon Shan Interchange West End which is classified as a District Distributor (DD). The data are measured in average annual daily traffic (AADT), which measures the amount of traffic daily on average.

== History ==
Planning for the road began around 1996, as part of the Tsing Ma Control Area, a small region of highways with special management. The road was to relieve the higher traffic travelling through Tsing Yi, especially with the new Hong Kong International Airport and developments in Lantau being built. The project included the road and its ramps, pedestrian pathways, noise barriers around the highway, surveillance system, and a maintenance centre in Tsing Yi. The Highways Department signed a contract with Gammon Construction Limited for HKD$775.6 million in February 1999, after it invited qualified contractors in October 1998. Construction began later that month.

During construction, techniques were used to prevent air pollution. Water was sprayed on roads, vehicles, and other areas to keep dust from leaving the site. Multiple viaducts, road embankments, and retaining walls were constructed in the project, with a set of walls replaced after its footings were damaged. Construction of the traffic control system began in November 2000, after the Transport Department signed an agreement with ABB Industrial and Building Systems Limited. The road was opened on 2 February 2002, after Donald Tsang inaugurated the road in a ceremony on 1 February. New speed limits were set to 70 kilometres per hour (43 mph) upon opening.

== Major intersections ==
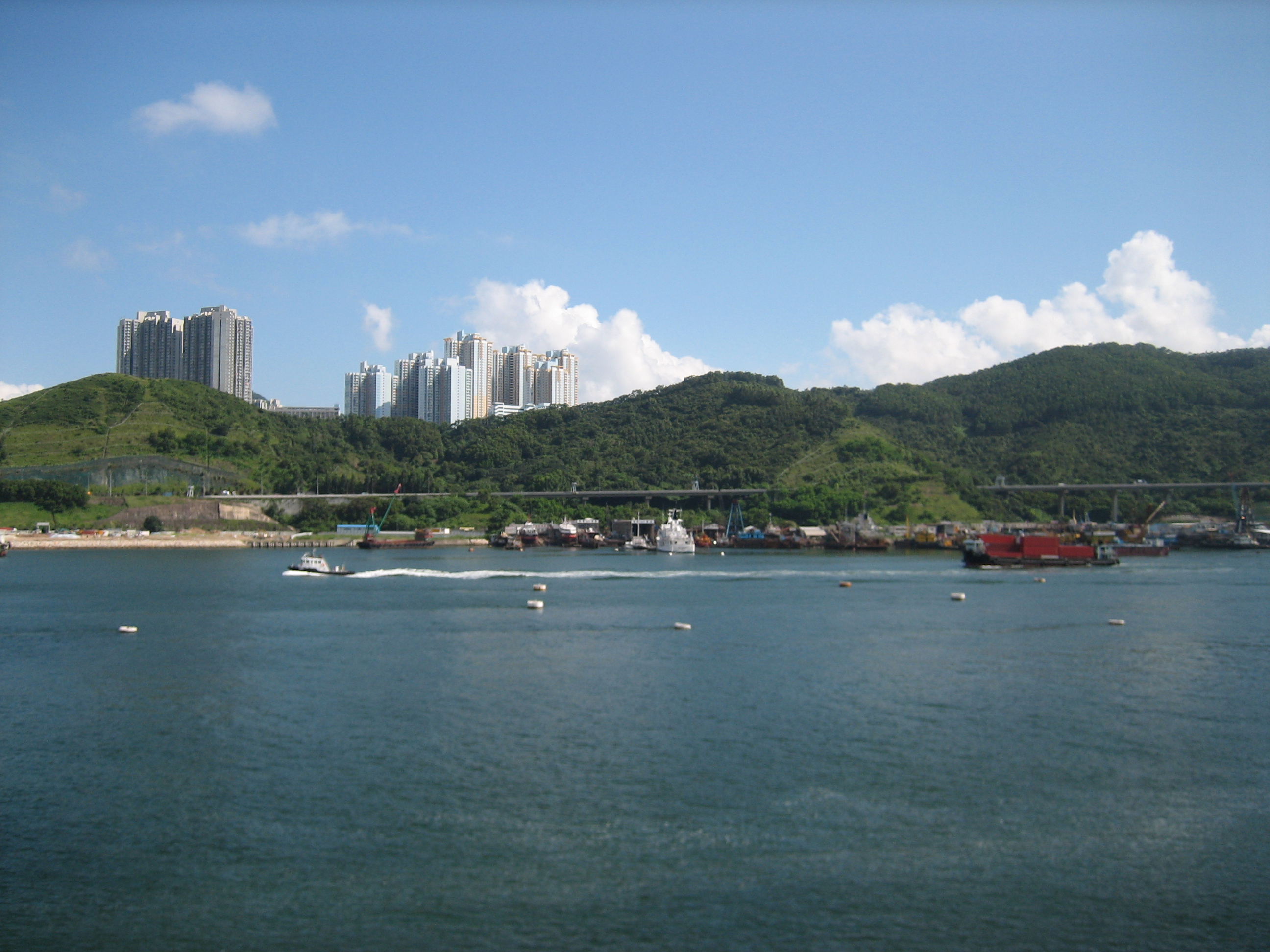
The road from the Tsuen Wan coastline in July 2008

The entire road is in Kwai Tsing District.

Location	km	mi	Destinations	Notes
Tsing Yi	0.0	0.0	Tsing Tsuen Road – Tsuen Wan, Kowloon, Sha Tin	Road continues eastbound as Tsing Tsuen Road
Tsing Yi	0.0– 0.5	0.0– 0.31	Tam Kon Shan Road / Tsing King Road / Tsing Tsuen Road / Fung Shue Wo Road (Tam Kon Shan Interchange) – Tsing Yi Town Centre	Roundabout
Tsing Yi	0.6– 1.0	0.37– 0.62	Tam Kon Shan Road – Cheung Shue Tau	To and from eastbound only
Shek Wan	2.2	1.4	Route 3 (Tsing Long Highway) / Route 8 (Lantau Link) – Lantau, Kowloon	Left-in/left-out
1.000 mi = 1.609 km; 1.000 km = 0.621 mi: Incomplete access

== See also ==
- List of streets and roads in Hong Kong
- Penny's Bay Highway
- Sha Lek Highway
