= 1990s in Hong Kong =

The 1990s in Hong Kong marked a transitional period and the last decade of colonial British rule in Hong Kong.

== Background ==
Central District, 1992

The 1984 Sino-British Joint Declaration paved the way for a series of changes that would facilitate the transfer of sovereignty from the United Kingdom to the People's Republic of China (PRC). In July 1992, Chris Patten was appointed as the last British Governor of Hong Kong. By contrast with his predecessors, Sir Edward Youde and Sir David Wilson, Patten had little experience with Hong Kong or China, and spoke neither Mandarin nor Cantonese. The decade was essentially dominated by the political backdrop of the handover.

== Politics ==
=== The handover ===
Flag of Hong Kong under British rule

Following the 1989 Tiananmen Square protests and massacre, citizens feared the Chinese government would not keep its promise of autonomy after the handover in Hong Kong. As a result, various mediating measures took place in the run-up to 1997. The Hong Kong Basic Law was ratified on 4 April 1990 as a mini-constitution. The pro-Beijing bloc welcomed the Basic Law, calling it the most democratic legal system to ever exist in the PRC. The pro-democratic bloc criticised it as not democratic enough. Patten emphasised the increase in democracy in Hong Kong through a series of measures that affected the election processes of both legislators and municipal officials. In 1994, the PRC announced that it would terminate the Legislative Council (LegCo) in favour of the "provisional legislative council". In 1995, LegCo was passed and the Democratic Party denounced the provisional legislative council as illegal. The provisional legislative council operated from Shenzhen before the handover.

Flag of the Hong Kong SAR

At midnight on 1 July 1997, the handover ceremony was held at the new wing of the Hong Kong Convention and Exhibition Centre at Wan Chai North. The flag of the United Kingdom and the flag of the Crown colony were lowered. The flags of the Hong Kong Special Administrative Region and China were raised. This marked the transfer of sovereignty of Hong Kong from British colonial rule to Chinese rule. Participated guests in the ceremony included The Prince of Wales (now Charles III), Prime Minister of the United Kingdom Tony Blair, CCP General Secretary and Chinese President Jiang Zemin, Chinese Premier Li Peng, the last Hong Kong Governor Chris Patten appointed by the United Kingdom, and Tung Chee Hwa, the first chief executive of Hong Kong elected from a Beijing-controlled election.

Chinese communists portrayed the return of Hong Kong as key moment in the PRC's rise to great power status.

== Demographics ==
Causeway Bay, 1993

=== Population ===
The population of Hong Kong in 1995 and 1999 was 6.3 million and 6.9 million respectively. A total of 44,000 illegal immigrants from mainland China were arrested and deported in 1993, with the number decreased to 35,500 a year later. Hong Kong's fertility rate also become the lowest in the world, having declined to just 5.1 child per population of 1,000 in 1996.

Despite the uncertainty brought by handover and economic crisis, the population of Hong Kong in the 1990s had still increased. In 1990, there were approximately 5,700,000 people in Hong Kong. A 500,000 growth in population was seen until 1996. While the numbers of natural increase had been dropping from 1990 to 1996, the growth rate brought by migration rose. This indicated the majority of the population growth was the result of migration mostly from mainland China. However, nearly 95% of people in Hong Kong were still Chinese including various ethnic groups except Cantonese such as Hakka and Teochew.

=== Emigration ===
In 1990, the outflow of people reached 62,000 people, or about one per cent of the population. The emigration rate would peak in 1992 with 66,000 people, followed by 53,000 in 1993, and 62,000 in 1994. An estimated US$4.2 billion flowed from Hong Kong to Canada directly as a result. Much renowned tycoons in Hong Kong, such as the Shaw family, left Hong Kong for fear of adverse effects to the economy after the handover. Many Hong Kong citizens emigrated to Great Britain through the British Nationality Selection Scheme. A comparable number of families also moved to Australia, Canada, and the United States.

=== Mass migration wave ===
Throughout the 90s in Hong Kong, there was a mass migration wave due to the concern about the handover from the British government to the People's Republic of China in 1997. Before handover, Hong Kong was identified as ‘British Hong Kong’ and governed by the British government since 1842. In 1984, the British government and Chinese government had signed the ‘Sino-British Joint Declaration’ indicating the handover of the control in 1997 that ended the lease of Hong Kong to the United Kingdom. In exchange, the Chinese government had agreed to keep the existing governmental structure of Hong Kong using the ‘One country, two systems’ method. According to the survey done by Wong, there were more than 60,000 Hong Kong emigrants in 1990 which accounts for 1% of the whole population and nearly half of the interviewees of the survey had expressed strong willingness to leave Hong Kong by 1997.

=== Foreign domestic workers ===
From the late 1980s to 1990s, Hong Kong's currency stabilised. The value of the Philippine peso was dropping steadily from 17 pesos in 1984 to 30 pesos in 1993 = US$1. This caused a surge of Philippines workers going to Hong Kong in search of higher salaries under the "maid to order" services. The number of foreign workers grew from 9,000 in 1987 to 28,000 in 1992 and 32,000 in 1993. Women from the Philippines make up the majority with substantial numbers from Indonesia and Thailand. The term "fei yung" (菲傭) became associated with the helpers.

Families in need of the helpers generally have both parents working at full-time positions. In 1993, households were required to have a combined income of HKD $15,000. The foreign workers essentially run all home affairs from cooking, ironing, cleaning and caring for the young and old in the household. Most households had 4 to 5 members including at least 1 child under the age of 12, while some include elderly people over 65. The hiring of workers fuelled a number of social debates. From the worker's perspective, problems range from unfair treatments, discrimination to low wages were raised. From the family perspective, problems range from privacy invasion to abuse type cases. Newspapers, radios and TV broadcasts have covered the subjects on numerous accounts. To stir controversies, the media often claimed traditional amah Chinese servants as superior workers.

== Culture ==
=== Music ===
Leslie Cheung dominated the Hong Kong music industry during the 80s and 90s. He started his singing career by winning the runner up in the 1977 Asian Singing Contest and was signed by Polydor Records. His early career was not successful; he was booed during his first public performance and his first three albums had poor sales, leading to him being terminated by Polydor Records. During the early 80s, singers Sam Hui and Roman Tam started the golden era of the Cantopop industry with music helping Leslie Cheung develop his music career, starting with the most iconic song “The Wind Blows On” in 1983. Since then, he released more than 40 albums with multiple platinum-selling records and performed 33 consecutive sold-out shows at the Hong Kong Coliseum in the early 90s.

The Hong Kong music industry had also seen its peak in the 1990s. After Leslie Cheung gradually stepped back from the music industry, the industry was essentially dominated by the Four Heavenly Kings: Aaron Kwok, Jacky Cheung, Andy Lau and Leon Lai including TV, movies, advertisements and magazines. In the early stages in their careers, Jacky Cheung and Leon Lai sang songs with Japanese melodies, but in the early to mid-1990s there was a public outcry for originality in local music. In 1993, the radio broadcasting company Commercial Radio, announced that it would play only locally-written music. The purpose was to encourage local musicians to write their own lyrics. In 1989, the annual sales of song albums among the whole music industry were approximately HK$2.5 billion. This indicates how large the music industry market was back in the 1990s. Mark Lui was a popular composer by the late 1990s.

Jacky Cheung was the most successful artist among the 4 of them. He started his singing career by winning the Amateur 18-Hong Kong District Singing Contest in 1984. He then won two IFPI Gold Disc Awards and eight IFPI Platinum Disc Awards in his singing career. He had also won many awards for his acting such as Best Supporting Actor in the 8th Hong Kong Film Awards in 1988 and the Best Supporting Actor Golden Horse Award in 1990. Some of his famous songs are “You Will Always Be My Love”, “Love You More Each Day” and “Breaking Up in the Rain”.

Andy Lau started his career in 1981 by participating in TVB’s artist training programme and published one of his most famous albums, “Would It Be Possible” that won him Top 10 Gold Song Award from RTHK in 1990. Since then, Andy Lau had set a Guinness World Records for winning the most awards with at least one RTHK award each year until 2007. Throughout his career, he has more than 60 albums published.

Aaron Kwok had a similar beginning with Andy Lau with joining TVB as a dancer trainee in 1984. He was then becoming an actor in TVB and started to be famous after acting in the Taiwanese motorcycle TV series in 1990. He then published his first Mandapop album in Taiwan, "Loving You Endlessly" in the same year and had sales of more than 1 million copies around Asia. After his first album, he released two more Cantopop albums which won him the Best New Artist Gold Award at the RTHK Top 10 Gold Songs Awards in 1991. Unlike the other three of the Four Heavenly Kings, Aaron Kwok contributed much not only to Cantopop but also Mandapop. Some other significant achievements of Aaron Kwok were winning the Jade Solid Gold Best Singer Award in 1997 and the Gold Award for Best Male Singer at Commercial Radio Annual Awards Ceremony in 1998.

Leon Lai started his singing career by winning the second runner-up in the New Talent Singing Awards in 1986 and being signed by Polygram. His first album was named after his name “Leon” and had successful sales. Another significant achievement was his 1993 album, “Summer Love” that won him the Most Popular Male Singer Award in the TVB's Jade Solid Gold in 1993. He was also one of the biggest stars for the advertisement campaign held by telecom giant Hutchison Telecom. Some other significant awards are the Bronze Awards for Best Male Singer at the Commercial Radio Annual Awards Ceremony from 1991 to 1994 and the Gold Award for Best Male Singer in 1996.

=== Entertainment ===
In the early 1990s, the entertainment industry became increasingly linked to Taiwan and mainland China. Numerous television drama series, especially with themes related to ancient Chinese, were imported from Taiwan and mainland China since the early 1990s, such as Justice Bao imported from Taiwan by TVB and Romance of the Three Kingdoms imported from mainland China by ATV's Home Channel, with both dramas becoming very successful and creating much discussion in the territory while broadcasting. A further successful example is the television drama My Fair Princess, a Taiwan-Mainland co-production. The show was broadcast in Hong Kong in 1999 by ATV's Home Channel and became popular among overseas Chinese worldwide. Another example of a popular mainland pop star was Faye Wong. She was born in Beijing and began singing in Cantonese, but later sang in both Mandarin and Cantonese as her career grew.

=== Foreign culture ===
In the early 1990s, Japanese culture significantly impacted Hong Kong culture with their pop culture including music and acting. Many entertainment companies in Japan expanded their business in Hong Kong which mainly targeted the middle class and teenagers obsessed with Japanese culture, cuisine and lifestyle, resulting in Hong Kong becoming one of the major places for Japanese culture exports. Successful marketing approach and promotional effect by the agents are two of the main factors contributing to the massive popularity of Japanese culture in Hong Kong during the 1990s.

Apart from Japanese culture, British culture contributed to a large part of Hong Kong culture. Hong Kong had been ruled by the British government for 156 years during the colonial period. The British brought different cultures into Hong Kong including eating habits, architecture, governmental system and education. All of the above cultures could still be seen in nowadays Hong Kong such as the legal system and the old buildings. This also leads to the unique characteristics of the Hong Kongers who are heavily impacted by British culture.

=== Cinema ===
The Hong Kong film industry had its golden age in the 1990s with a record of around 200 films in a year. An iconic director was Wong Kar-wai, he had contributed a large proportion to the success of the Hong Kong film industry. He had been nominated and received multiple awards around the world. For example, ‘Chungking Express’ won the Hong Kong Film Awards in 1995 and won the best director at the Cannes Film Festival. Wong's films were also on the list of BBC Culture's 100 greatest foreign-language films with ‘Happy Together’ (1997) at 71, ‘Chungking Express’ (1994) at 56 and ‘In the Mood for Love’ (2000) at 9.

Stephen Chow is another icon of the Hong Kong film industry. He has been named as Hong Kong's “king of comedy”. He started his career in 1981 as TV series actor and became a movie actor in 1988 which brought him great success from his first movie, “Final Justice (1988 film)”. He was awarded the best supporting actor award at the 25th Golden Horse Awards. A popular culture of “mo lei tau” was invented by him which is some nonsensical humour and most of the 1990s Hong Kong movie consisted of such elements. Some of Stephen Chow’s famous movie in the 1990s are the gambling comedy “All for the Winner” in 1990, the gangster comedy “Fight Back to School” in 1991 and action comedy “Justice, My Foot!” in 1992.

Apart from the contribution to music industry, Leslie Cheung had also starred in many different movies in the 90s collaborated with famous directors and actors such as Wong Kar-wai and Stephen Chow. Throughout the 1990s, Leslie Cheung and Wong Kar-wai has produced movies including “Days of Being Wild” that won Leslie Cheung the Best Actor Award in the 10th Hong Kong Film Awards, “Ashes of Time” that won Leslie Cheung the Best Actor Award in the 1995 Hong Kong Film Critics Society Award and “Happy Together (1997 film)” that won Leslie Cheung the Best Actor Award in both the 34th Golden Horse Awards and 17th Hong Kong Film Awards. One of his greatest achievements was winning the Palme d’Or at the 1993 Cannes Film Festival with “Farewell, My Concubine (film)” that is still the only Hong Kong movie that has won this award.

=== Law and order ===
In 1999, Hong Kong's Court of Final Appeal ruled that children born on the mainland would be entitled the right of abode in Hong Kong so long as either parent was a Hong Kong permanent resident. This decision led to the government's reinterpretation of the Basic Law which overturned the ruling and determined that a parent would have to be a Hong Kong permanent resident at the time of the child's birth to transmit residency.

== Economy ==
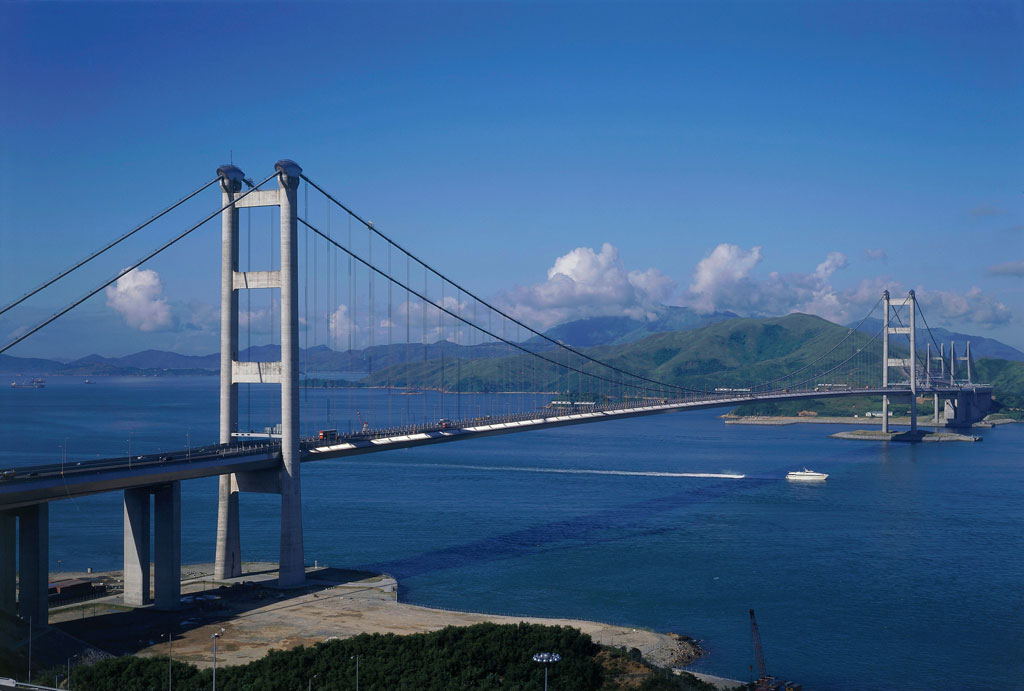
Tsing Ma Bridge, opened 1997

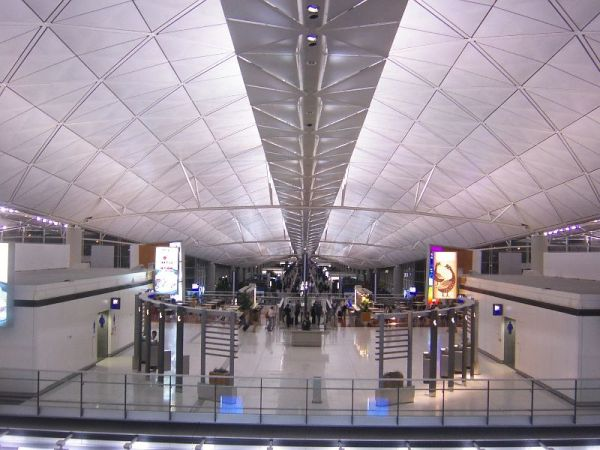
New Hong Kong International Airport, opened 1998

=== Finance ===
Three months after the handover in July 1997, Hong Kong was dragged into the Asian Financial Crisis. At one point, the stock market fell by 22.8% within a week. Between the summer of 1997 and 1998, the leading shares in the Hang Seng Index lost nearly 2/3 of its value. The government had to intervene by buying billions of dollars' worth of shares. While this may have prevented the market from collapsing and staved off pressure for the Hong Kong dollar to be unpegged from the US dollar, the move was widely criticised as it undermined Hong Kong's status of a free market economy.

In 1997, a large-scale financial crisis occurred in Asia in which Indonesia, South Korea and Thailand suffered the most impacts. Hong Kong had also been affected with moderate economic loss. Hong Kong had suffered from a drop of around 0.1% on the stock market per day. However, minimal loss had been made for Hong Kong due to a solid and well organised bank system, effective liquidation law and good regulatory infrastructure. Therefore, the fluctuation of Hong Kong Dollar and Hang Seng Index has been minimised despite the attack held by an American billionaire investor George Soros.

=== Manufacturing sector ===
During the 1990s, Manufacturing sectors in Hong Kong had been shrinking due to increasing manufacturing costs such as transportation cost, salary and rent. According to the statistics from Legislative Council Secretariat, more than 50% decrease had occurred in the new establishments in the manufacturing sector from 1990 to 1998 and there are nearly 65% drop for the employment in the sector. Moreover, the percentage shared by the manufacturing sector in Gross Domestic Product had declined from nearly 18% in 1990 to less than 7% in 1997. This showed that a transition in Hong Kong's economic system was happening throughout the 1990s and lower reliance on the manufacturing sector. Hong Kong gradually started to become dominant in the financial related industry after the 1990s.

=== Real estate ===
In 1998, the real estate bubble burst due to the government's housing policy, though the Asian financial crisis also had some influence. Upon the inauguration of Hong Kong SAR's first chief executive, Tung Chee Hwa announced the building of 85,000 flats a year, while reducing public housing wait time from 7 to 3 years. These factors combined to begin the most severe recession in Hong Kong since 1967, which was a year of ambitious government projects that used up fiscal reserves on infrastructure and structural deficit.

=== Transportation ===
In 1998, the Kai Tak Airport was closed. The new US$20 Billion Hong Kong International Airport opened for commercial use. The initial years of operation were challenging as it utilised state-of-the-art computer systems, in just about every function imaginable. The scale and size of the airport also required many innovative solutions from the Airport Authority. Over time, it became the central connecting point for many flights in the far east.

The Tsing Ma Bridge, part of the Lantau Link connecting the remote airport site to the city, was the world's second largest suspension bridge when it opened on 27 April 1997. Spanning 1,377 m (4,518 ft), it is also the largest of all bridges in the world carrying rail traffic.

The Tung Chung and Airport Express MTR lines opened in 1998.

Other major transport projects completed in the 1990s include the Tate's Cairn Tunnel (1991), San Tin Highway (1993), Yuen Long Highway (1993), North Lantau Highway (1997), Kap Shui Mun Bridge (1997), Western Harbour Crossing (1997), and Tai Lam Tunnel (1998). Many of these related to the airport project, or to completing the New Territories orbital highway.
