= Airport Core Programme =

1990s infrastructure projects in Hong Kong

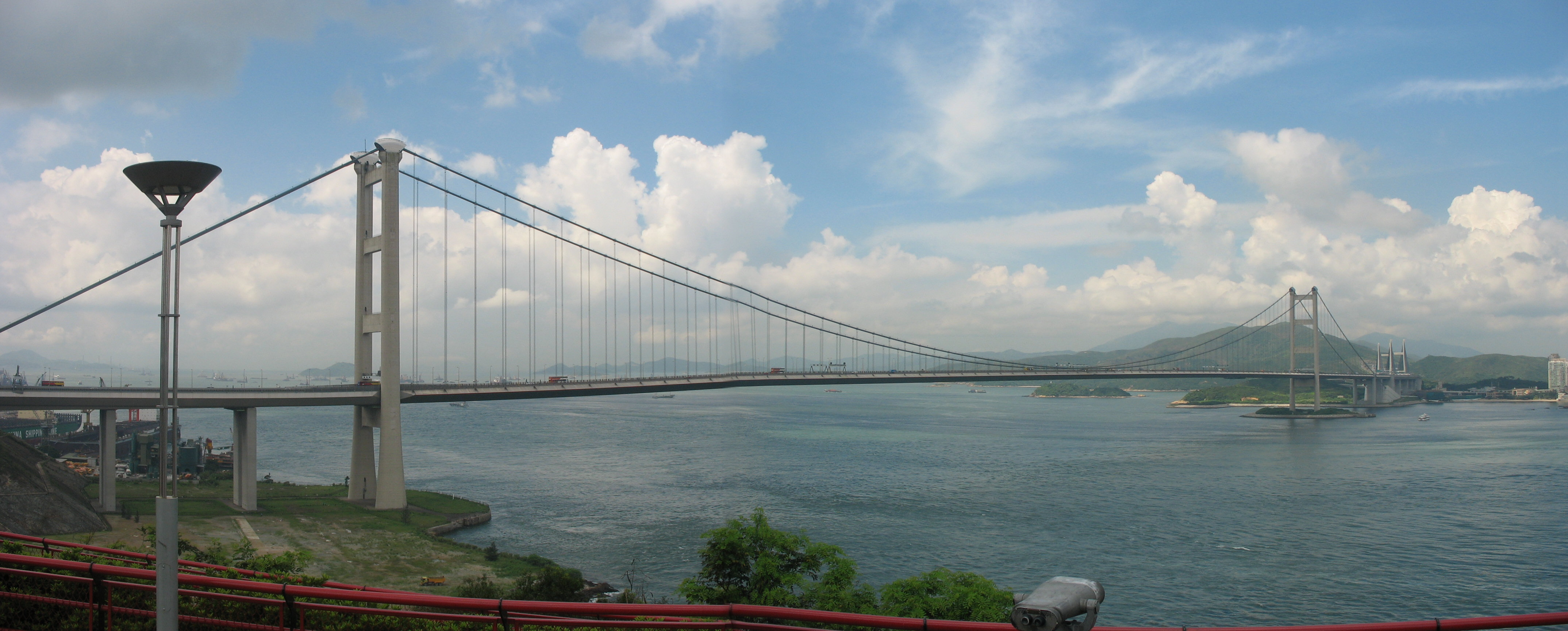
- Tsing Ma Bridge, part of the Airport Core Programme
- Traditional Chinese: 香港機場核心計劃
- Simplified Chinese: 香港机场核心计划
- Cantonese Yale: Hēung góng gēi chèuhng haht sām gai waahk
Transcriptions
Standard Mandarin
- Hanyu Pinyin: Xiānggǎng Jīchǎng Héxīn Jìhuà
Yue: Cantonese
- Yale Romanization: Hēung góng gēi chèuhng haht sām gai waahk
- Jyutping: Hoeng1 gong2 gei1 coeng4 hat6 sam1 gai3 waak6

The Airport Core Programme, commonly known as the Rose Garden Project, was a series of infrastructure projects associated with the new Hong Kong International Airport and part of the Port and Airport Development Strategy.

The cost for the whole project was estimated at over HK$200 billion, and the Chinese Government was concerned about its impact on the financial reserve of the future Hong Kong Government. Several changes were made to the plan, including the shortening in distance of the two main towers of the Tsing Ma Bridge and the construction of the Airport Railway as a double-track railway, to reduce costs. The project ended up costing HK$160.2 billion.

The Programme formally commenced after the signing of a memorandum of understanding between British Prime Minister John Major and Chinese Premier Li Peng in Beijing on 3 September 1991, and lasted eight years in total. It was the most expensive airport project in the world, according to the Guinness World Records. It was the biggest infrastructure programme in Hong Kong's history.

== History ==
Plans to replace the old Kai Tak Airport were drafted after the Second World War. However, for financial and political reasons, the plan was abandoned in 1951 and the Hong Kong Government decided to expand the original airport instead.

With the growth of the economy of Hong Kong during the 1970s, the project reemerged for discussion. The government earmarked Chek Lap Kok, just off the north coast of Lantau Island near Tung Chung, as the designated site for the new airport. However, the plan was shelved in 1983 for economic reasons, as well as the question of Hong Kong's sovereignty and the impending signing of the Sino-British Joint Declaration.

The plan was announced on 11 October 1989 by the then Governor David Wilson, and it was perceived to be part of the government's effort to reinstate confidence in Hong Kong after the Tiananmen Square protests of 1989. The public was initially surprised by the huge budget and there were concerns that it would drain much of the public revenue. The programme was completed with the opening of the new Hong Kong International Airport at Chek Lap Kok in July 1998.

== The Ten Core Projects ==
The programme included:

=== Hong Kong International Airport ===
The Hong Kong International Airport was the centrepiece of the project; it provided the foundation for the other nine core projects of the Airport Core Programme. Chek Lap Kok was selected as an optimal site due to its development potential. Construction finally started in 1992 and was planned to finish in mid-1997. Chris Patten, the last Governor of Hong Kong, expressed his hope of leaving Hong Kong via the new airport after the transfer of sovereignty of Hong Kong, though this did not materialise. The airport finally came into operation on 6 July 1998, at a cost of around US$20 billion.

=== Airport Railway ===
The Airport Railway was built to connect Kowloon Peninsula and Hong Kong Island (over the Western Immersed Tube) to the airport and the planned new town of northern Lantau. The railway is operated by the MTR Corporation and has two routes: the Airport Express and the Tung Chung line which provides a commuter service linking the new town of Tung Chung to the city. These two lines share the same double-tracks for most of their routes, however, the railway was initially planned to have four tracks along its length. The commuter service offered by the Tung Chung line also provided relief to the overcrowded Tsuen Wan line of the MTR.

=== Lantau Link ===
Comprising the Kap Shui Mun Bridge, Tsing Ma Bridge and Ma Wan Viaduct, the Lantau Link connects Lantau with Tsing Yi, via Ma Wan. It carries both road and railway traffic between the islands.

=== Western Harbour Crossing ===
This is the third cross-harbour tunnel for Victoria Harbour. Built under a build-operate-transfer agreement with the Western Harbour Tunnel Company, the tunnel was intended to relieve congestion at the Cross-Harbour Tunnel and is part of expressway Route 3.

=== North Lantau Expressway ===
With the highest posted speed limit in Hong Kong, at 110 km/h (68 mph) on most of its length, this six-lane motorway links Tung Chung in the west to the Lantau Link in the east, via the north coast of Lantau. It is a major component of Hong Kong's Route 8 motorway. A service road, Cheung Tung Road, runs parallel to it between Tung Chung and Yam O.

=== Route 3 – Kwai Chung and Tsing Yi Sections ===
Route 3 is one of the 10 strategic expressway routes of Hong Kong, linking Sai Ying Pun on Hong Kong Island and Yuen Long in the New Territories. The Kwai Chung and Tsing Yi sections were built to link the Lantau Link and West Kowloon Expressway.

The Kwai Chung section is 3 km (1.9 miles) in length. The route connects with the West Kowloon Highway near Lai Chi Kok, then bypasses the Kwai Tsing Container Terminals, finally connecting with the Cheung Tsing Bridge of the Tsing Yi section. It is an 8-lane elevated motorway. This section is now known as Tsing Kwai Highway.

The Tsing Yi section comprises the 500-metre (550 yd) long Cheung Tsing Bridge, which crosses over Rambler Channel, and the 1.6 km (0.99 miles) Cheung Tsing Tunnel, which cuts through the high ground on Tsing Yi Island. This section is now known as the Cheung Tsing Highway.

=== West Kowloon Highway ===
This is a six-lane motorway 4.2 km (2.6 miles) in length with the northern 2 km (1.2 miles) elevated for the Airport Railway running underneath. It links the Kowloon portal of the Western Harbour Crossing in the south to the Tsing Kwai Highway in the north and is built entirely on newly reclaimed land in West Kowloon.

=== Land reclamation in West Kowloon ===
Reclamation work was needed along the west coast of Kowloon Peninsula to provide land for the expressway, Route 3, as well as the supporting infrastructure. The Airport Railway also runs through the reclaimed land of West Kowloon. The reclamation work increased the area of Kowloon Peninsula by 30%.

=== Central Reclamation Phase I ===
This phase required the reclamation of an area of 20 hectares (49 acres) along the waterfront of Central to provide land for the Airport Railway's Hong Kong station. Two ferry piers serving outlying islands as well as a government dockyard had to be relocated to facilitate the work.

=== Phase I of North Lantau New Town ===
The first phase of the new town in Northern Lantau is centred on Tung Chung and was planned to provide housing to 18,000 people. The new town was meant to be a supporting community for the new Hong Kong International Airport, as well as to act as a "gateway" to Hong Kong for visitors. At present, phases I, II and IIIA of the new town have been completed, all around Tung Chung. When all 4 phases are completed, the new town will be home to 320,000 people, covering an area of 830 hectares (2,100 acres) between Tung Chung and the neighbouring area of Tai Ho.

== Exhibition Centre ==
The now defunct Airport Core Programme Exhibition Centre introducing the programme is located in Ting Kau near Sham Tseng in Hong Kong.
