= Route 3 (Hong Kong) =

Road in Hong Kong

Route 3

- Alignment and exits of Route 3 (zoom in to view exit details)
- Route 3 highlighted in red

Route information
- Maintained by Highways Department
- Length: 27.2 km (16.9 mi)
- Existed: 1998–present

Major junctions
- South end: Connaught Road West, Sai Ying Pun
- Tsing Sha Highway, Cheung Sha Wan; Ching Cheung Road, Kwai Chung; Tsuen Wan Road, Kwai Chung; Lantau Link, Tsing Yi; Tuen Mun Road, Ting Kau
- North end: San Tin Highway/Yuen Long Highway in Yuen Long

Location
- Country: China
- Special administrative region: Hong Kong
- Districts: Central and Western, Yau Tsim Mong, Sham Shui Po, Kwai Tsing, Tsuen Wan, Yuen Long

Highway system
- Transport in Hong Kong; Routes; Roads and Streets
← Route 2	→ Route 4

Route 3 (Chinese: 三號幹綫; Jyutping: saam1 hou6 gon3 sin3) is a series of expressways in Hong Kong that runs from Sai Ying Pun on Hong Kong Island to Yuen Long in the New Territories, linking West Kowloon, Kwai Chung and Tsing Yi. It was built as part of the Airport Core Programme to provide access to Hong Kong International Airport from the city, and to relieve congestion in the New Territories. The Western Harbour Crossing and Tai Lam Tunnel that form part of the route are tollways.

== Route description ==
The route originates at the junction with Route 4 at Connaught Road in Sai Ying Pun, and immediately crosses the Victoria Harbour through the tolled Western Harbour Crossing. From then on it heads northwest on a viaduct along the West Kowloon Highway, above the Tung Chung line and Airport Express tracks. This section has three exits that connects with Route 8, Route 7 and Route 5 respectively. It then enters the Tsing Kwai Highway in Lai Chi Kok and continues west to Tsing Yi Island on Rambler Channel Bridge. Once it reaches the island, the Cheung Tsing Tunnel immediately follows. At the other end of the tunnel, Route 3 enters the Tsing Yi Northwestern Interchange and meet with Route 8 again. The interchange is a gateway to Lantau Island and Chek Lap Kok Airport. Route 3 then makes a sharp turn and travels north on Ting Kau Bridge and quickly enters the tolled Tai Lam Tunnel. From there, the remainder of the route is dubbed the Country Park Section which runs all the way to Kam Tin along the Tsing Long Highway, and joins Route 9 near Pok Oi Hospital.

The route is made up of the following roads:

- Western Harbour Crossing
- West Kowloon Highway
- Tsing Kwai Highway
- Cheung Tsing Bridge and Cheung Tsing Tunnel (within Tsing Ma Control Area)
- Cheung Tsing Highway (within Tsing Ma Control Area)
- Ting Kau Bridge (within Tsing Ma Control Area)
- Tai Lam Tunnel
- Tsing Long Highway

== Exits and interchanges ==
District	Location	Road Name	km	mi	Exit	Destinations	Notes
Central and Western	Sai Ying Pun	Western Harbour Crossing	0.0	0.0	1A	Route 4 (Connaught Road West eastbound) – Sai Ying Pun, Sheung Wan, Central, Wan Chai	Joins Route 4
Central and Western	Sai Ying Pun	Western Harbour Crossing	0.0	0.0	1B	Route 4 (Connaught Road West westbound) – Shek Tong Tsui, Kennedy Town, Pok Fu Lam	Joins Route 4
Victoria Harbour		Western Harbour Crossing	0.2–2.2	0.1–1.4	Western Harbour Tunnel (tolled)		
Yau Tsim Mong	West Kowloon	West Kowloon Highway	2.4	1.5	—	Jordan Road	Unnumbered northbound exit only
Yau Tsim Mong	Yau Ma Tei	West Kowloon Highway	3.0	1.9	2	Lai Cheung Road – Mong Kok, Tai Kok Tsui, Sha Tin, High Speed Railway Station, Airport Express Station, Tsim Sha Tsui and Yau Ma Tei	
Sham Shui Po	Lai Wan	West Kowloon Highway	6.2	3.9	3	Route 8 (Tsing Sha Highway [Lai Wan Interchange]) – Tsing Yi, Lantau, Hong Kong Disneyland, Hong Kong International Airport, Lai Chi Kok, Cheung Sha Wan	Southbound motorists must use exit 4 for Sha Tin and Lantau
Sham Shui Po	Mei Foo	Tsing Kwai Highway	7.7	4.8	4	Mei Ching Road (Mei Foo Interchange) – Container Terminals 1–8, Lai King and Sha Tin	Southbound motorists use roundabout for Sha Tin and Lantau
Sham Shui Po	Mei Foo	Tsing Kwai Highway	8.3	5.2	4A	Route 7 (Ching Cheung Road) – Sha Tin, Kwun Tong	Southbound exit and northbound entrance only
Kwai Tsing	Lai King	Tsing Kwai Highway	9.3	5.8	4B	Route 5 (Tsuen Wan Road) – Kwai Chung, Tsing Yi (North), Airport Express Station, Tsuen Wan	Northbound exit and southbound entrance only
Kwai Tsing	Kwai Chung	Tsing Kwai Highway	10.0	6.2	4C	Kwai Tsing Road – Tsing Yi (South)	Northbound exit and southbound entrance only
Kwai Tsing	Rambler Channel	Tsing Kwai Highway	11.0–11.4	6.8–7.1	Cheung Tsing Bridge		
Kwai Tsing	Tsing Yi	Cheung Tsing Highway	11.4–13.0	7.1–8.1	Cheung Tsing Tunnel		
Kwai Tsing	Tsing Yi	Cheung Tsing Highway	14.0	8.7	4D	Route 8 (Tsing Sha Highway) – Container Terminals 8–9, Kowloon (West), Sha Tin	Southbound exit and northbound entrance only
Kwai Tsing	Tsing Yi	Cheung Tsing Highway	14.1	8.8	4E	Tsing Yi Road West – Tsing Yi, Tsuen Wan and Airport Express Station	Southbound exit and northbound entrance only
Kwai Tsing	Tsing Yi	North West Tsing Yi Interchange	14.7	9.1	5	Route 8 (Lantau Link) – Lantau, Hong Kong Disneyland, Hong Kong International Airport	
Kwai Tsing	Tsing Yi	North West Tsing Yi Interchange	14.7	9.1	5A	View Point and Administration Building	Southbound exit only, northbound exit and entrance; exit for Tsing Yi North Coastal Road
Kwai Tsing	Tsing Yi	Tsing Long Highway	15.2–16.5	9.4–10.3	Ting Kau Bridge		
Tsuen Wan	Ting Kau	Tsing Long Highway	16.8	10.4	6	Route 9 (Tuen Mun Road) – Sham Tseng, Tuen Mun, Tsuen Wan	Northbound interchange clockwise, southbound interchange anticlockwise only
Tai Lam		Tsing Long Highway	17.7–21.5	11.0–13.4	Tai Lam Tunnel (tolled)		
Yuen Long	Pat Heung	Tsing Long Highway	23.0	14.3	6A	Pat Heung Road – Pat Heung	Northbound exit and southbound entrance only
Yuen Long	Kam Tin	Tsing Long Highway	25.0	15.5	6B	Kam Tin Road – Kam Tin and Au Tau	Northbound exit and southbound entrance only
Yuen Long	Au Tau	Au Tau Interchange	27.2	16.9		Route 9 (Yuen Long Highway (anticlockwise)/San Tin Highway (clockwise))	Joins Route 9
1.000 mi = 1.609 km; 1.000 km = 0.621 mi: Incomplete access; Tolled
