= Cheung Tsing Highway =

Highway in Hong Kong

Coordinates: 22.3448°N 114.0944°E

Cheung Tsing Highway
- Part of Route 3
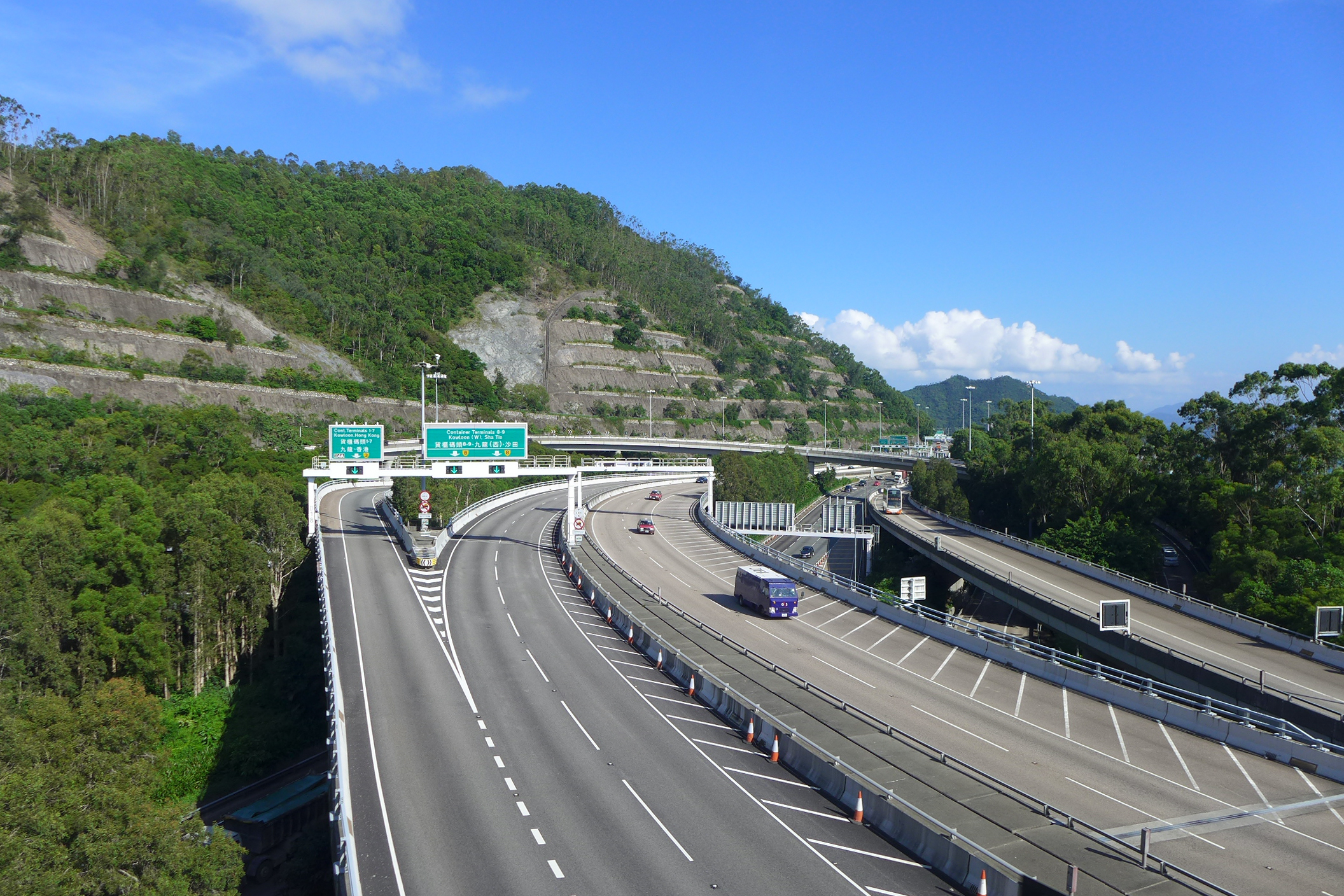

Route information
- Maintained by Highways Department
- Length: 1.2 km (0.75 mi)
- Existed: 1997–present

Major junctions
- Southeast end: Cheung Tsing Tunnel
- Northwest end: North West Tsing Yi Interchange

Location
- Country: China
- Special administrative region: Hong Kong

Highway system
- Transport in Hong Kong; Routes; Roads and Streets

Cheung Tsing Highway (Chinese: 長青公路; Jyutping: coeng4 cing1 gung1 lou6) is a highway of Route 3 between Cheung Tsing Tunnel and North West Tsing Yi Interchange on Tsing Yi Island, New Territories, Hong Kong. It was built as part of the Airport Core Programme together with the rest of Route 3 to provide a new highway link from North Western New Territories towards Hong Kong Island, and connects with Route 8 to provide access to the new Hong Kong International Airport.

It leads to Tsing Long Highway at North West Tsing Yi Interchange, and also connects to Lantau Link and Tsing Yi Road West there. Its eastern end leads into Cheung Tsing Tunnel which is connected to Tsing Kwai Highway by Cheung Tsing Bridge.

In the early morning of 30 November 2018, a coach ferrying workers to Hong Kong International Airport collided with a broken-down taxi on the highway, killing six people – the coach driver, the taxi driver and four of the coach passengers. The coach driver was suspected to have fallen asleep, and had previously been involved in two other early-morning coach accidents in 2018. On 5 December, a memorial service for four of the victims was held at the accident site on the portion of Cheung Tsing Highway in Tsing Yi; the section of road was closed for two hours.

== Interchanges ==
Cheung Tsing Highway
Eastbound exits	Exit number	Westbound exits
continues as Tsing Kwai Highway
End Cheung Tsing Highway		Start Cheung Tsing Highway
Cheung Tsing Tunnel
NORTH WEST TSING YI INTERCHANGE; Container Port Terminals, Sha Tin; Tsing Sha Highway	4D	no exit
NORTH WEST TSING YI INTERCHANGE; Tsing Yi South; Tsing Yi Road West	4E	no exit
see Tsing Long Highway	5	NORTH WEST TSING YI INTERCHANGE; Lantau; Lantau Link
no exit	5A	NORTH WEST TSING YI INTERCHANGE; Lantau Link administration building, View Point, Tsing Yi North, Tsuen Wan; Tsing Yi North Coastal Road
Start Cheung Tsing Highway		End Cheung Tsing Highway; NORTH WEST TSING YI INTERCHANGE continues on as Tsing Long Highway

== See also ==
Other highways in Kowloon and New Territories:

- Tsing Kwai Highway – Route 3
- West Kowloon Corridor – Route 5
- West Kowloon Highway – Route 3
- Tsing Long Highway – Route 3
- Tate's Cairn Highway – Route 2
- Tsing Sha Highway – Route 8

Preceded by Tsing Kwai Highway	Hong Kong Route 3 Cheung Tsing Highway	Succeeded by Tsing Long Highway

Preceded by Tsing Sha Highway	Hong Kong Route 8 Cheung Tsing Highway	Succeeded by Lantau Link
