= Tsing Long Highway =

Road in Hong Kong

Coordinates: 22.3735°N 114.0703°E

- Part of Route 3
- Map of Tsing Long Highway

Route information
- Length: 12.5 km (7.8 mi)
- Existed: 1998–present

Major junctions
- South end: Tsing Yi North
- Four; Route 8 at Tsing Yi; Route 9 at Au Tau and Ting Kau
- North end: Kam Tin (near Au Tau)

Location
- Areas / neighbourhoods: Tsing Yi, Pat Heung, Kam Tin and Au Tau
- Districts: Kwai Tsing, Tsuen Wan and Yuen Long
- Subdivision: New Territories
- Country: Hong Kong (special administrative region)
- Sovereign state: People's Republic of China

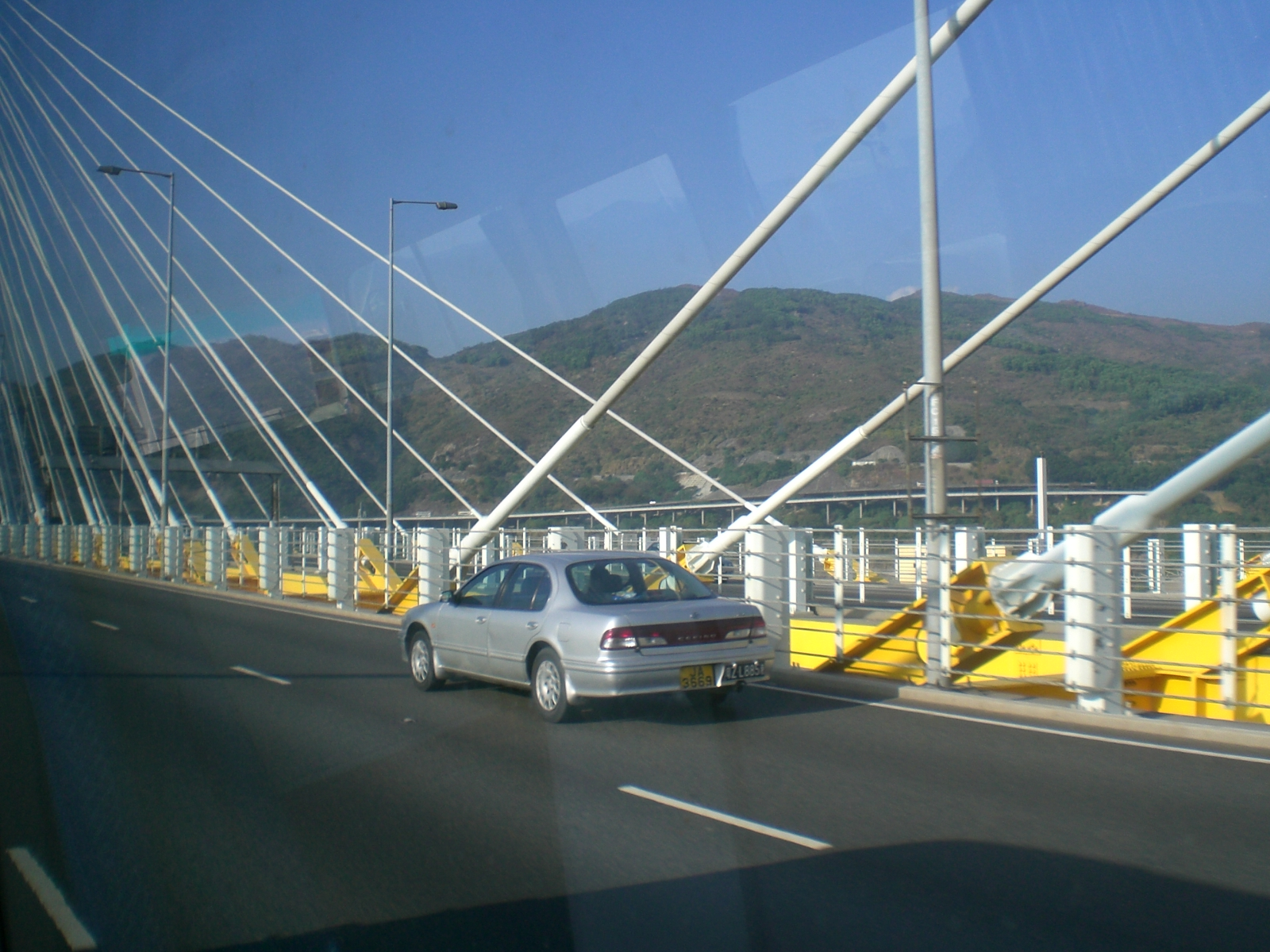
Tsing Long Highway at Ting Kau Bridge

Tsing Long Highway (Chinese: 青朗公路; Jyutping: cing1 long5 gung1 lou6) is a motorway of Route 3 from North West Tsing Yi Interchange on Tsing Yi Island to Yuen Long, in Hong Kong. Ting Kau Bridge and Tai Lam Tunnel are part of the motorway. It connects with Cheung Tsing Highway and Lantau Link at its southern end, and San Tin Highway and Yuen Long Highway at its northern end. Its speed limit at parts south of Tai Lam Tunnel and in that tunnel is 80 km/h (50 mph) and parts north of Tai Lam Tunnel is 100 km/h (62 mph).

There are no intermediate exits on the southbound carriageway of Tsing Long Highway on the north of Tai Lam Tunnel, so this entire section is a toll road. Likewise there are no entrances on the northbound carriageway on this section.

The motorway is designated an expressway except for the Tai Lam Tunnel stretch.

== Interchanges ==
Tsing Long Highway
Southbound exits	Exit number	Northbound exits
continues as Cheung Tsing Highway
End Tsing Long Highway		Start Tsing Long Highway
NORTH WEST TSING YI INTERCHANGE; Lantau, Tsing Yi; Lantau Link, Tsing Yi North Coastal Road	5	see Cheung Tsing Highway
Ting Kau Bridge
TING KAU INTERCHANGE; Sham Tseng, Tsing Lung Tau and Tuen Mun; Tuen Mun Road	6	TING KAU INTERCHANGE; Tsuen Wan, Sha Tin and Kwai Chung; Tuen Mun Road
Tai Lam Tunnel
no exit	6A	Pat Heung, Shek Kong; Pat Heung Road
no exit	6B	Kam Tin, Au Tau; Kam Tin Road
Start Tsing Long Highway		End Tsing Long Highway; End of Route 3 intersects with Yuen Long Highway and San Tin Highway

== See also ==
Other highways in Kowloon and the New Territories:

- Tsing Kwai Highway – Route 3
- West Kowloon Corridor – Route 5
- West Kowloon Highway – Route 3
- Tsing Long Highway – Route 3
- Tate's Cairn Highway – Route 2
- Cheung Tsing Highway – Route 3

Preceded by Cheung Tsing Highway	Hong Kong Route 3 Tsing Long Highway	Succeeded by Northern terminus
