= Ma Wan Viaduct =

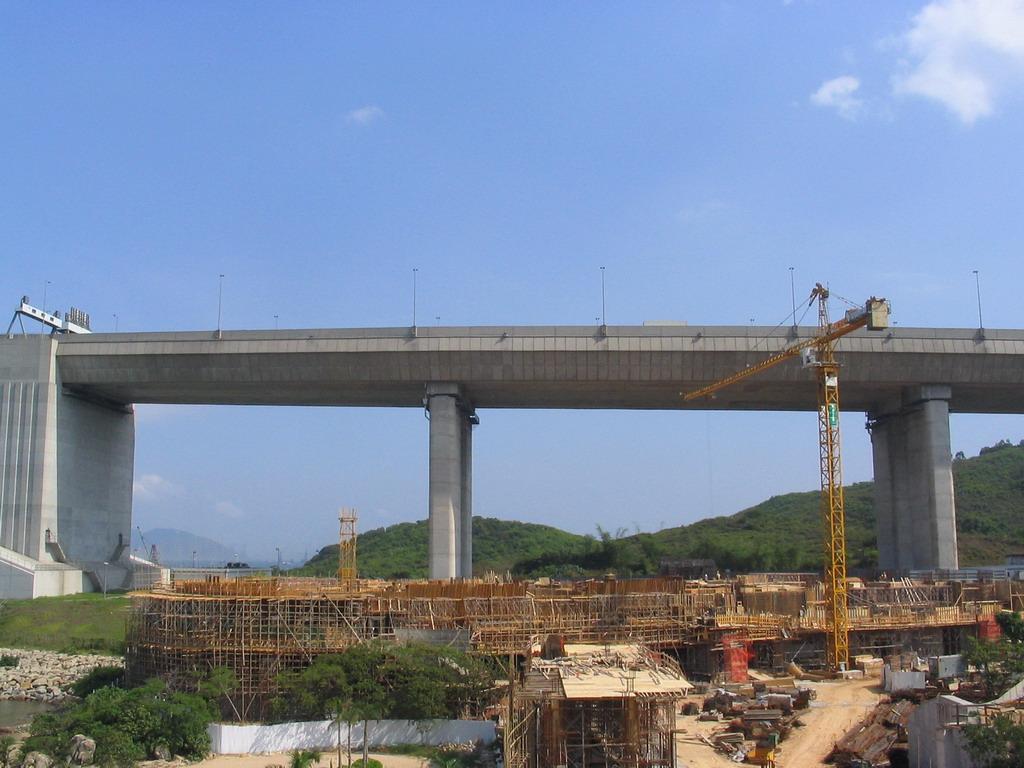
- Coordinates: 22°20′51″N 114°3′38″E
- Carries: Route 8
- Crosses: Ma Wan
- Maintained by: Tsing Ma Management Limited, Hong Kong

Characteristics
- Design: Concrete box girder
- Total length: 503 m (1,650 ft)

History
- Opened: 22 May 1997; 27 years ago

Statistics
- Daily traffic: 54,000

Ma Wan Viaduct coloured red

Ma Wan Viaduct is a viaduct built over Ma Wan, an island in Hong Kong. The viaduct connects the Tsing Ma Bridge and Kap Shui Mun Bridge with an exit to Ma Wan Road, and is part of the Lantau Link (formerly known as the Lantau Fixed Crossing) and Route 8. It was opened on 22 May 1997 and was built to provide access to the Hong Kong International Airport (Chek Lap Kok Airport) as part of the Airport Core Programme.

It is 503 metres (1,650 ft) long and has six spans (one 80-metre (260 ft) long span, four 87-metre (285 ft) long spans, and one 75-metre (246 ft) long span). It is built using post-tensioned concrete.

The Ma Wan Viaduct has the same cross section as the Tsing Ma and Kap Shui Mun Bridges: a dual three-lane carriageway on the upper deck and two tracks of railway and two lanes of roadway in the enclosed lower deck. The lanes on the lower deck allow for maintenance and the diversion of traffic during high winds. The railway carries the Tung Chung and Airport Express lines of Hong Kong's Mass Transit Railway (MTR).
