= Lantau Link =

Road linking western and central Hong Kong

Lantau Link
- Part of Route 8

Route information
- Maintained by Highways Department
- Length: 4.0 km (2.5 mi)
- Existed: 27 April 1997–present

Major junctions
- East end: Tsing Yi
- 3; Route 3 at Tsing Yi
- West end: Lantau (near Tsing Chau Tsai)

Location
- Country: China
- Special administrative region: Hong Kong

Highway system
- Transport in Hong Kong; Routes; Roads and Streets

Lantau Link
- Traditional Chinese: 青嶼幹線
- Simplified Chinese: 青屿干线
Transcriptions
Standard Mandarin
- Hanyu Pinyin: Qīngyǔ Gànxiàn
Yue: Cantonese
- Yale Romanization: ching1 yu4 gon3 sin3

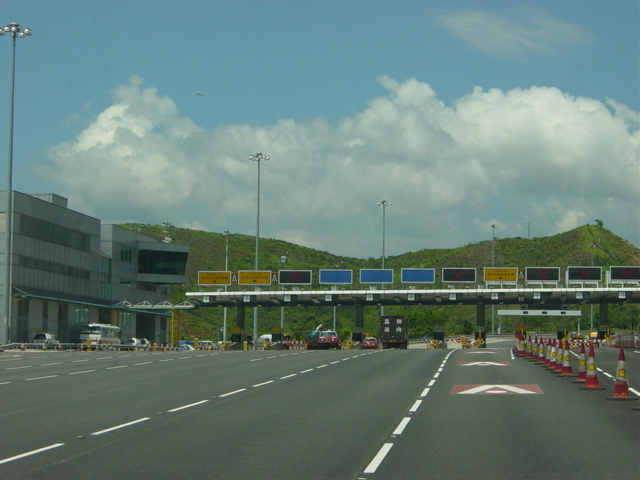
Lantau Link toll plaza at Tsing Chau Tsai, on Lantau Island.

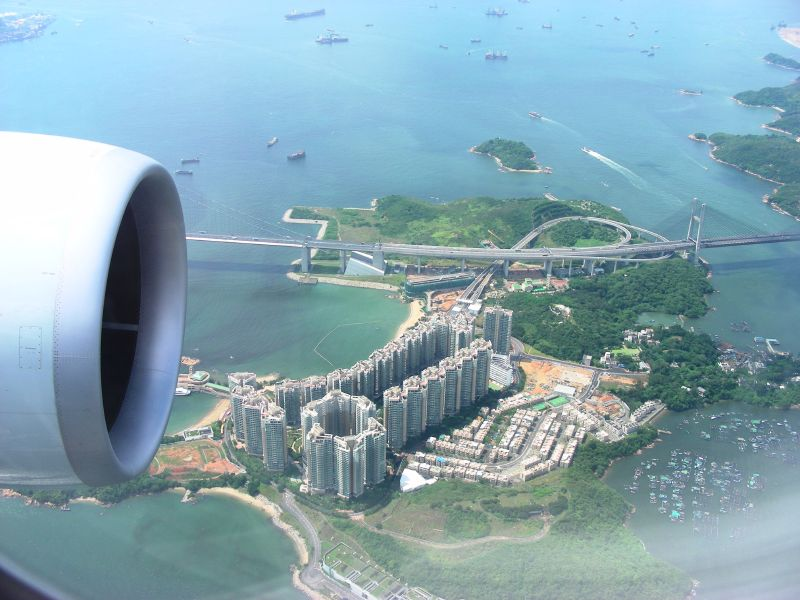
The Lantau Link crossing the island of Ma Wan. From left to right: Tsing Ma Bridge, Ma Wan Viaduct (on the island) and Kap Shui Mun Bridge.

The Lantau Link, formerly known as the Lantau Fixed Crossing, is a roadway in Hong Kong forming part of Route 8 linking Lantau Island to Tsing Yi, from which other roads lead to the urban areas of Kowloon and the rest of the New Territories. It is part of the Airport Core Programme centred on the new Hong Kong International Airport on Lantau. The link was officially opened on 27 April 1997, and it opened to traffic on 22 May the same year.

== Infrastructure ==
The Lantau Link is 3.5 kilometres (2.2 mi) long and consists of:

- the Tsing Ma Bridge, a suspension bridge linking Tsing Yi to Ma Wan island
- the Ma Wan Viaduct, a viaduct crossing Ma Wan
- the Kap Shui Mun Bridge, a cable-stayed bridge linking Ma Wan to Lantau Island

The link is split into two traffic levels; the upper level is an open, 3-lane divided highway, while the lower level is a double-track railway line used by the MTR Airport Express and Tung Chung line and also contains two single-lane roads for emergency use in both directions. The speed limit is 80 kilometres per hour (50 mph) on the upper level and 50 kilometres per hour (31 mph) on the lower level. The lower level is generally used only in special circumstances such as strong wind or serious accidents which could lead to the closure of the upper level. The lower level is not connected to Ma Wan.

The Lantau Link is one of the two land passageways connecting Lantau and other parts of Hong Kong; Tuen Mun–Chek Lap Kok Link via Tuen Mun opened on 27 December 2020 as the second land connection, reducing the traffic pressure on Lantau Link.

Near the Tsing Yi end of the Lantau Link is the cable-stayed Ting Kau Bridge, and the Cheung Tsing and Nam Wan tunnels, the latter of which leads to the Stonecutters Bridge. Tsing Yi is also home to the Lantau Link Visitors Centre, a museum and viewing platform for the Lantau Link.

== Interchanges ==
Lantau Link
Inbound exits	Exit number	Lantau-bound exits
End Lantau Link; continues as Tsing Sha Highway	-	Start Lantau Link
Cheung Tsing Highway; Container Terminals 1–7, Kowloon, Hong Kong	4A	no exit
Tsing Long Highway; Yuen Long, Tuen Mun	4B	no exit
Tsing Ma Bridge
Ma Wan Viaduct
no exit	4C	Ma Wan Road; Ma Wan; enter by permit only
Kap Shui Mun Bridge
Start Lantau Link	-	End Lantau Link; continues as North Lantau Highway
No exit numbers in kilometres or miles are available for this table.

== See also ==
- Route 8 (Hong Kong)
- Tsing Ma Control Area
- Transport in Hong Kong

Preceded by Tsing Sha Highway	Hong Kong Route 8 Lantau Link	Succeeded by North Lantau Highway
