= San Tin Highway =

Road in Hong Kong

Coordinates: 22.48500°N 114.05860°E

San Tin Highway
- Part of Route 9

Route information
- Maintained by Highways Department
- Length: 7.9 km (4.9 mi)
- Existed: 1993–present

Major junctions
- North end: San Tin (near Chau Tau)
- 3; Route 3 at Au Tau
- South end: Kam Tin (near Au Tau)

Location
- Country: China
- Special administrative region: Hong Kong

Highway system
- Transport in Hong Kong; Routes; Roads and Streets

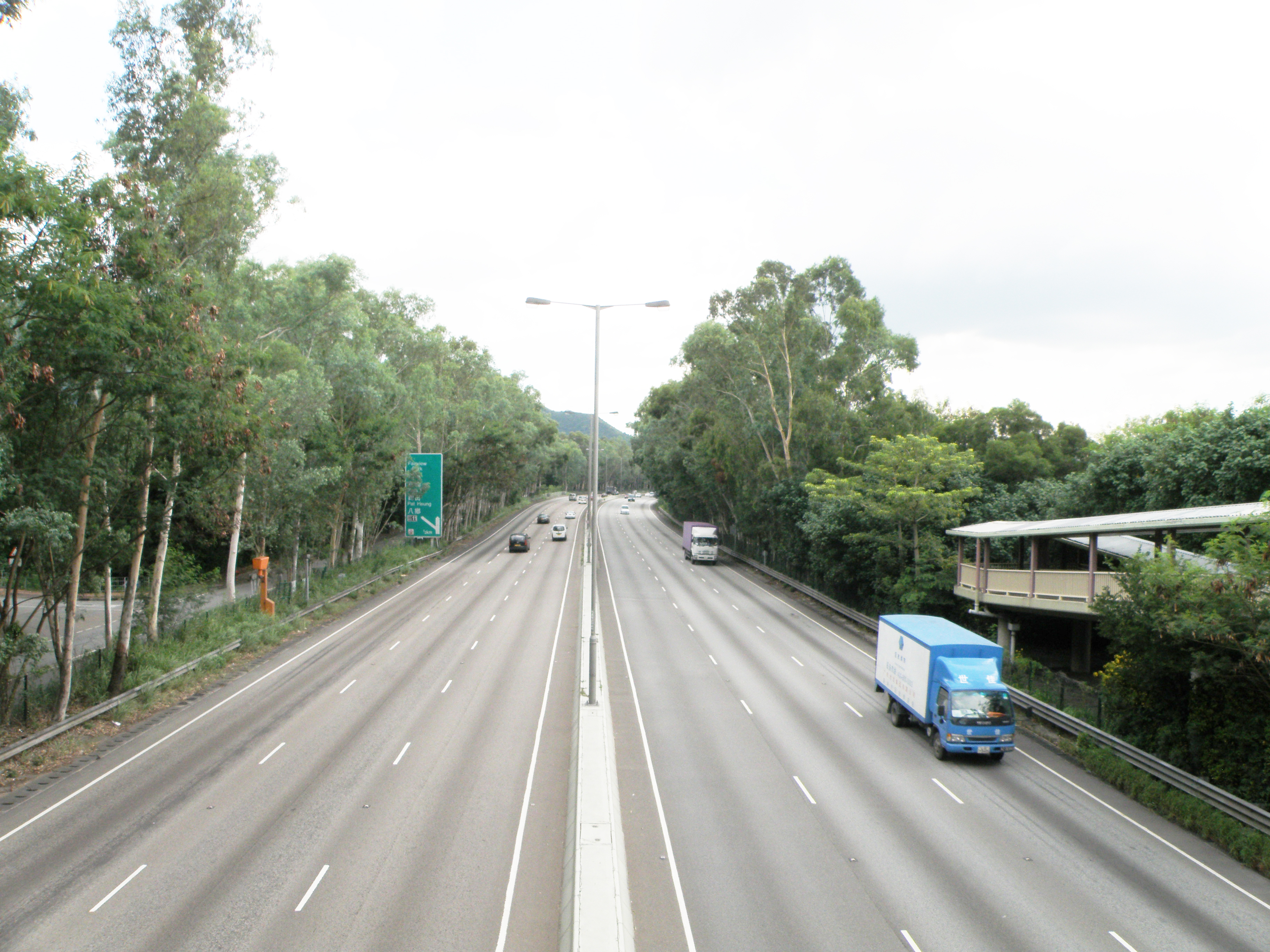
San Tin Highway in August 2014

San Tin Highway (Chinese: 新田公路; Jyutping: san1 tin4 gung1 lou6) is a northeast-southwest expressway at San Tin in north-western New Territories of Hong Kong. San Tin Highway connects Fanling Highway at its northeastern end at San Tin Interchange to a fork at the Tsing Long Highway and Yuen Long Highway at Kam Tin River east of Yuen Long at the southwestern end of the San Tin Highway. San Tin Highway is also part of Route 9. The road was completed between 1991 and 1993.

== Description ==
San Tin Highway connects the Tsing Long Highway and the Yuen Long Highway north of Au Tau, near the new town of Yuen Long. It is also part of Route 9. The road was completed between 1991 and 1993. The speed limit of the expressway is 100 km/h.

The intersection between San Tin Highway and Fanling Highway is the San Tin Interchange. Slip roads from San Tin Interchange on to San Sham Road lead 2 km north to Hong Kong's only 24-hour border crossing at the Lok Ma Chau Control Point–Huanggang Port border crossing with Shenzhen in mainland China. The slip roads were completed in January 2007. Before their construction, the vast amount of lorries and goods vehicles using the roundabout caused serious traffic congestion, on San Sham Road and occasionally on San Tin Highway.

Before the completion of Tsing Long Highway, the southern end of the Highway connected to Castle Peak Road and Au Tau Interchange. When Tsing Long Highway was opened in 1998, San Tin Highway was connected to it, thus linking up with Tai Lam Tunnel and Yuen Long Highway. The interchange near Fairview Park is the roundabout which has the most exits in Hong Kong. It has 7 entrances and exits which lead to:

- Fairview Park (Joining Fairview Park Boulevard)
- San Tin Highway (Bidirectional)
- Castle Peak Road — Tam Mi (Bidirectional)
- San Tam Road (Bidirectional)

== Interchanges ==
San Tin Highway
Northbound exits	Exit number	Southbound exits
continues as Fanling Highway
End San Tin Highway		Start San Tin Highway
San Tin Exchange; Lok Ma Chau, San Tin, Kwu Tung; San Sham Road, Castle Peak Road – San Tin, Castle Peak Road – Chau Tau, Kwu Tung Road	10	San Tin Exchange; Lok Ma Chau, San Tin, Kwu Tung; San Sham Road, Castle Peak Road – San Tin, Castle Peak Road – Chau Tau, Kwu Tung Road
San Tin, Mai Po; Mai Po Lung Road, Shek Wu Wai Road	10A	no exit
Fairview Park and Kam Tin; Fairview Park Boulevard, Castle Peak Road – Tam Mi, San Tam Road	11	Fairview Park and Kam Tin; Fairview Park Boulevard, Castle Peak Road – Tam Mi, San Tam Road
Start San Tin Highway		End San Tin Highway continues on as Yuen Long Highway intersects with Tsing Long Highway

Preceded by Fanling Highway	Hong Kong Route 9 San Tin Highway	Succeeded by Yuen Long Highway
