= Lantau Link Visitors Centre and Viewing Platform =

Museum on Tsing Yi, Hong Kong

Coordinates: 22.3584°N 114.081°E

- Traditional Chinese: 青嶼幹綫訪客中心及觀景台
Transcriptions
Yue: Cantonese
- Yale Romanization: Chēng jeuih gon sin fóng haak jūng sām kahp gūn gíng tòih
- Jyutping: Cing1 jyu4 gon3 sin3 fong2 haak3 zung1 sam1 kap6 gun1 ging2 toi4

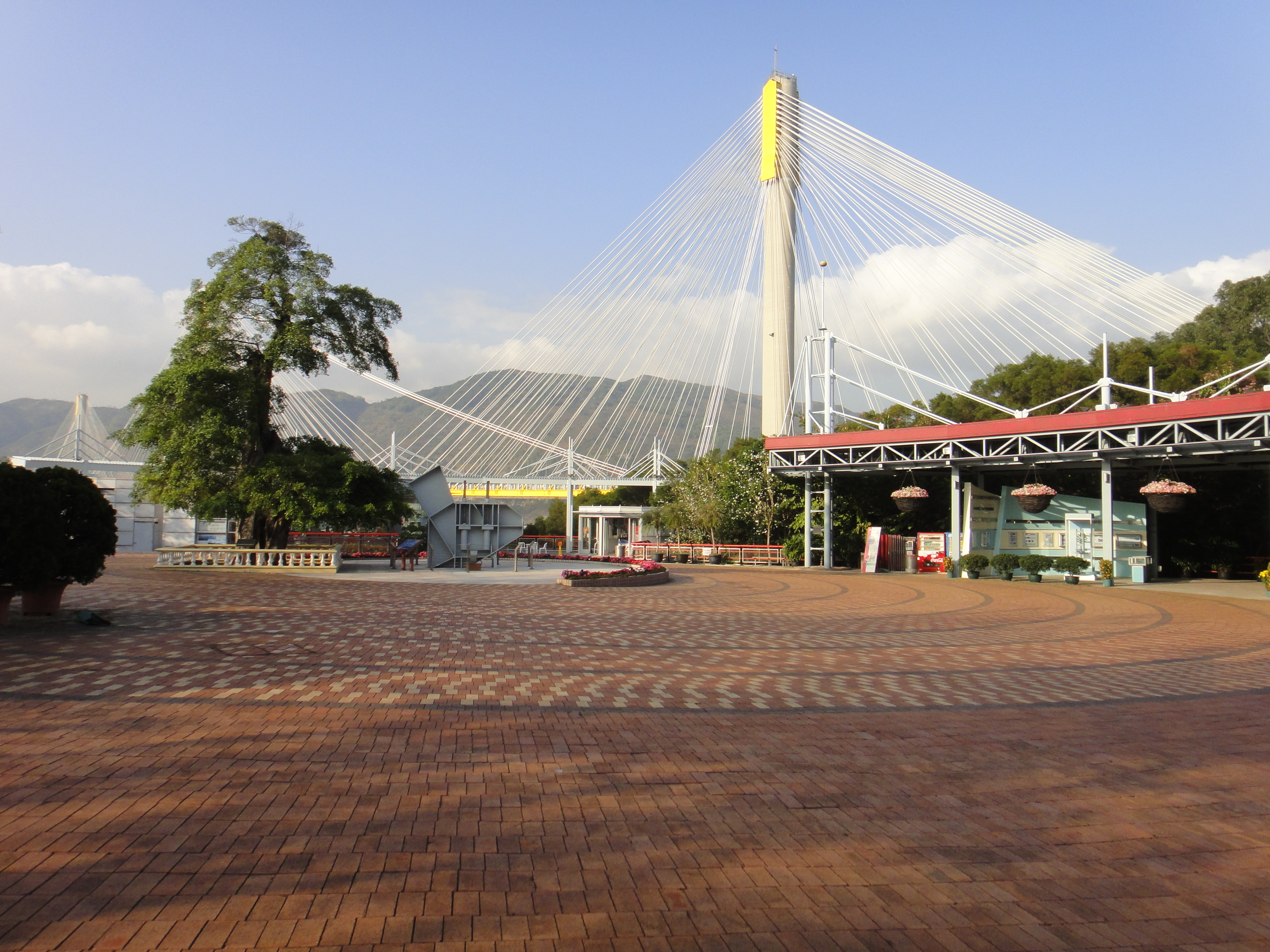
Lantau Link Visitors Centre

The Lantau Link Visitors Centre and Viewing Platform is a Hong Kong museum located on the Tsing Yi Island.

== History ==
The Lantau Link Visitors Centre and Viewing Platform are located at northwestern Wok Tai Wan, Tsing Yi Island, offering a direct view of the Tsing Ma Bridge, Kap Shui Mun Bridge, and Ting Kau Bridge. It was constructed when the Tsing Ma Bridge began its development in 1992, intended to establish the bridge as a landmark and provide tourists with a vantage point. The entire area covers approximately 19,000 square meters. It was opened to the public in 1997, coinciding with the completion of the Tsing Ma Bridge. Initially funded by the Kwai Tsing District Council, it was taken over by the government in 2021 and is now jointly managed by the Home Affairs Department and the Leisure and Cultural Services Department. It displays the information of the Lantau Link with models, photographs and panel texts as well as two computer quizzes provided for the visitors testing their knowledge of the Lantau Link. From 2017 to 2020, the centre attracted approximately 80,000 to 130,000 visitors annually, but this number dropped significantly during the COVID-19 pandemic, with only 53,280 visitors recorded in 2023.

In 2014, a café and a railway model shop, operated by a couple, opened at the visitor centre.

In January 2021, Oriental Daily News reported that the government had provided insufficient funding to maintain the centre, leading to significant damage to various facilities, including the viewing platform's railings, which were only repaired by the government twice between 2008 and 2019. In October, the centre was closed for renovations. In August 2023, the Home Affairs Department began public consultations on revitalizing the centre and viewing platform, with a tentative completion deadline of 2026.

== Transportation ==
The Lantau Link Visitors Centre can only be accessed by minibus route 308M.

== See also ==
- Airport Core Programme Exhibition Centre

== Exhibition link ==
- Lantau Link Visitor Centre and Viewing Platform
