= Cheung Tsing Tunnel =

Tunnel on Tsing Yi Island, Hong Kong

Coordinates: 22.34877°N 114.11188°E

- Interactive map of Cheung Tsing Tunnel

Overview
- Status: Active
- System: Part of Route 3
- Start: Cheung Tsing Bridge
- End: Cheung Tsing Highway

Operation
- Opened: 22 May 1997; 29 years ago
- Owner: Hong Kong Government
- Traffic: Vehicular

Technical
- Length: 1.6 km (0.99 mi)
- No. of lanes: 6 lanes (3 lanes per direction)
- Operating speed: 70 km/h (45 mph)

Cheung Tsing Tunnel
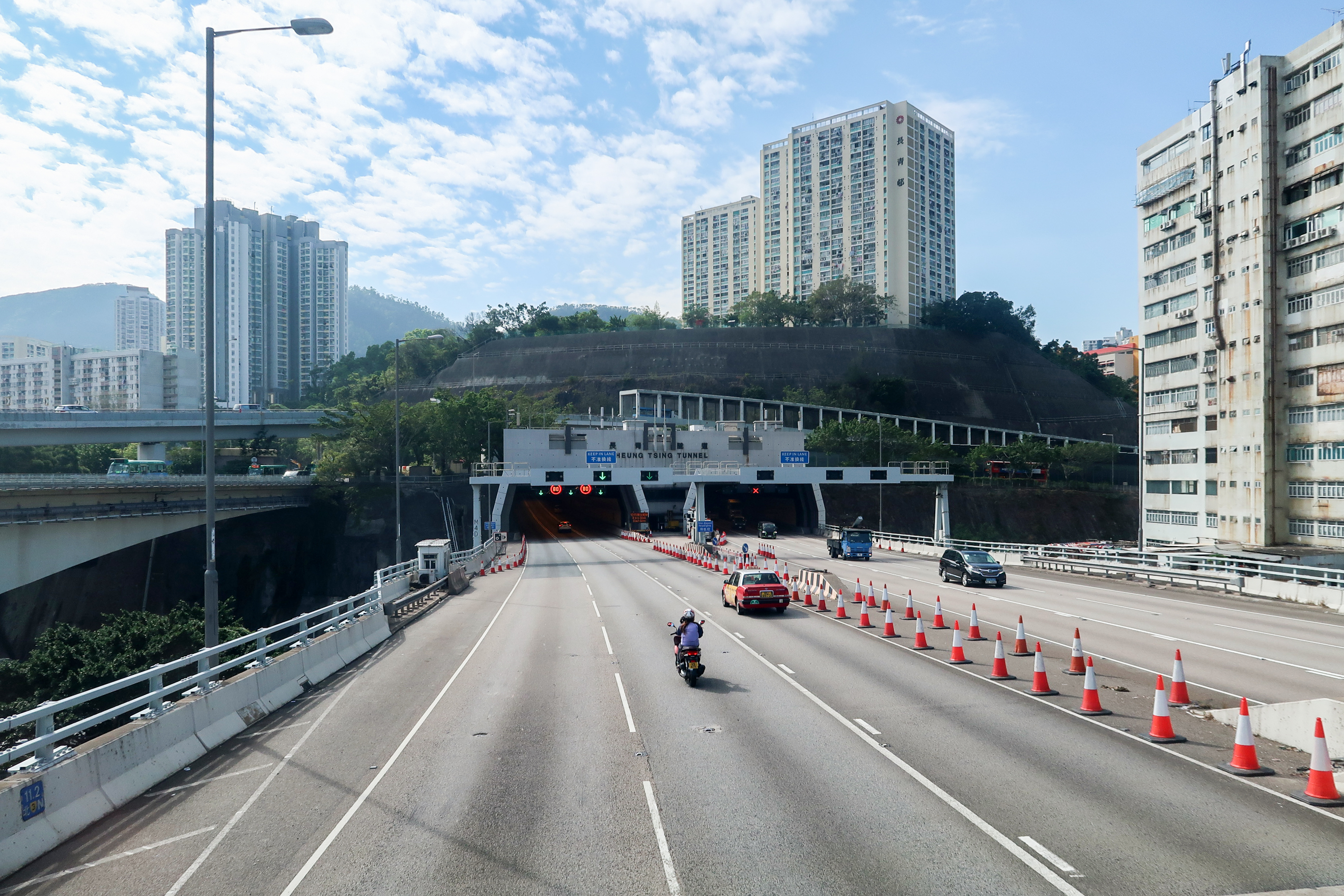
- Traditional Chinese: 長青隧道
- Simplified Chinese: 长青隧道
Transcriptions
Standard Mandarin
- Hanyu Pinyin: Chángqīng Suìdào
Yue: Cantonese
- Yale Romanization: cheung4 ching1 seui6 dou6

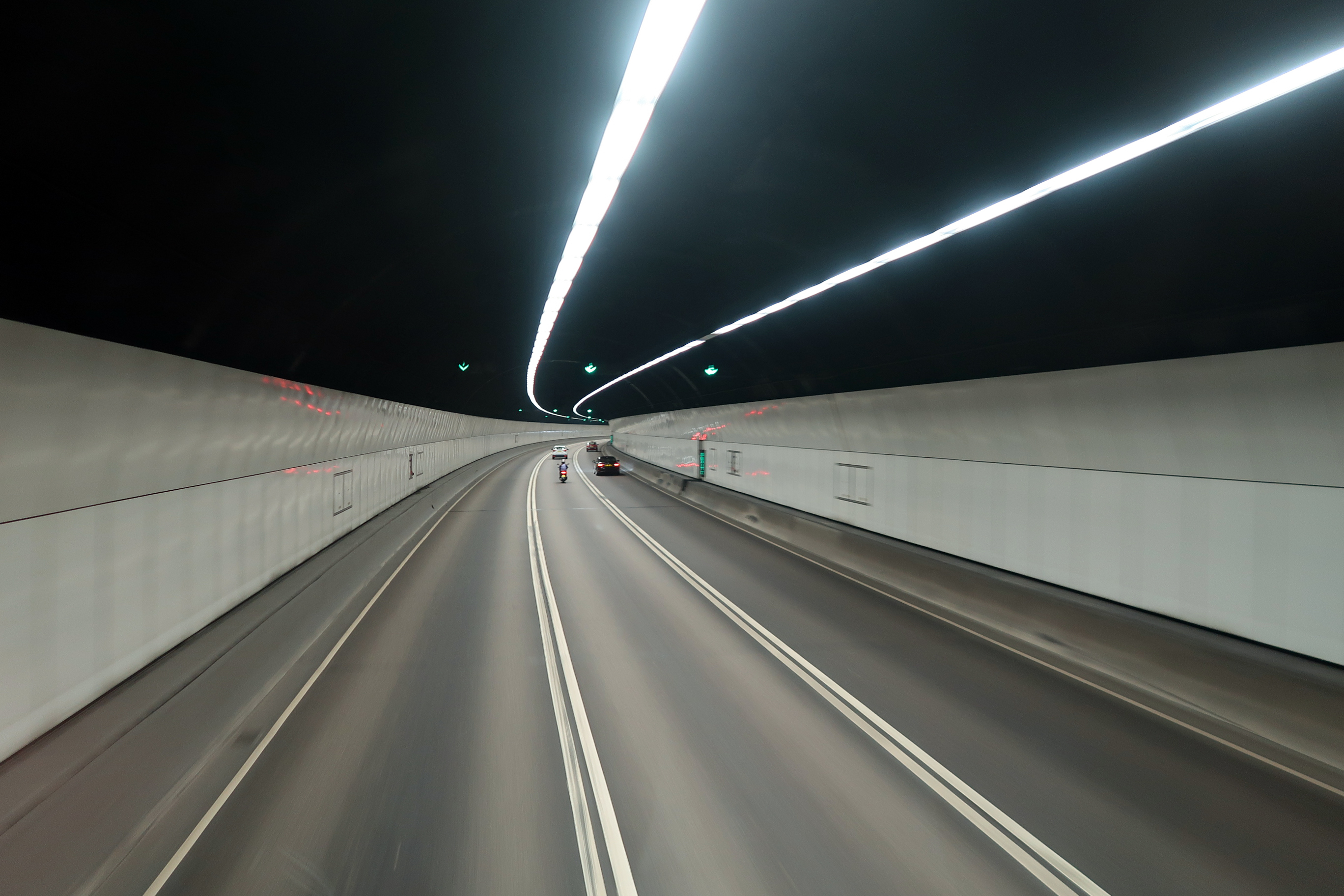
Cheung Tsing Tunnel interior

Cheung Tsing Tunnel, also spelled Cheung Ching Tunnel, is a dual-tube, 3-lane tunnel on Tsing Yi Island, Hong Kong. It is part of Route 3. Its east end connects to Cheung Tsing Bridge and west Cheung Tsing Highway. The tunnel was opened on 22 May 1997 and is the second toll-free tunnel in Hong Kong. Its length is about 1.6 kilometres.

== Construction ==
The tunnel was named "Cheung Ching" (長青) because it is beneath Cheung Ching Estate, the first public housing estate on the island.

Construction through the granite of Tsing Yi Peak required explosives to get through the hardness of the hill. To prevent dislodging of rocks and buildings on the surface slopes, the rocks were reinforced by concrete and steel. Although the tunnel used explosives in its construction, boring was more used as the primary digging procedure.

Construction commenced in May 1993 and was completed in January 1997.

== Management ==
The tunnel was managed by Tsing Ma Management Limited under Tsing Ma Control Area, along with Tsing Ma Bridge, Kap Shui Mun Bridge, Ting Kau Bridge, Rambler Channel Bridge, North Lantau Highway and Tsing Kwai Highway.

The tunnel traffic is monitored in the buildings at both end, namely East Portal and West Portal Buildings.

Preceded by Cheung Tsing Bridge	Hong Kong Route 3 Cheung Tsing Tunnel	Succeeded by Cheung Tsing Highway
