= Ting Kau Bridge =

Bridge in New Territories, Hong Kong

Ting Kau Bridge 汀九橋
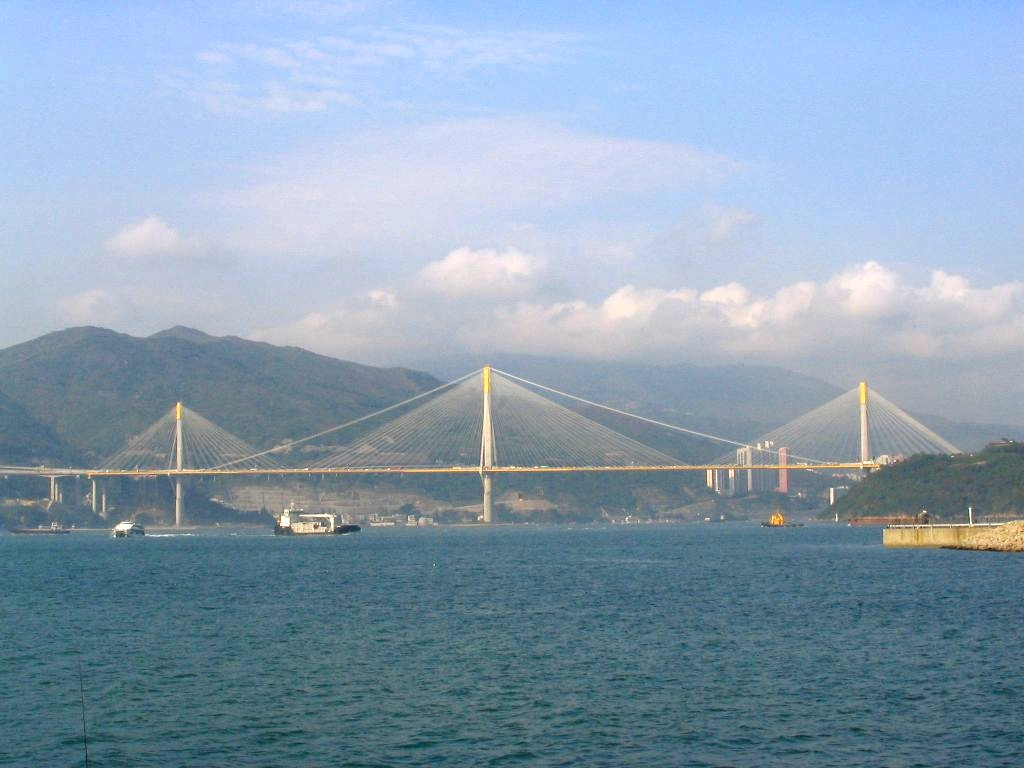
- Ting Kau Bridge
- Coordinates: 22°21′51″N 114°4′48″E
- Carries: 6 lanes of roadway
- Crosses: Rambler Channel
- Locale: Tsing Yi Island and Ting Kau
- Official name: Ting Kau Bridge

Characteristics
- Design: Cable-stayed bridge
- Total length: 1,177 metres (3,862 ft)
- Longest span: 448 metres (1,470 ft) and 475 metres (1,558 ft)

History
- Opened: 5 May 1998; 28 years ago

Statistics
- Toll: N/A

Location
- Interactive map of Ting Kau Bridge 汀九橋

Ting Kau Bridge
- Traditional Chinese: 汀九橋
- Simplified Chinese: 汀九桥
Transcriptions
Standard Mandarin
- Hanyu Pinyin: Tīngjiǔ Qiáo
Yue: Cantonese
- Yale Romanization: ding1 gau2 kiu4

Ting Kau Bridge is a 1,177-metre (3,862 ft) long cable-stayed bridge in Hong Kong that spans from the northwest of Tsing Yi Island and Tuen Mun Road. It is near the Tsing Ma Bridge which also serves as a major connector between the Hong Kong International Airport on Lantau Island and the rest of Hong Kong. It was completed on 5 May 1998. The bridge is toll-free.

The bridge is part of Route 3, connecting the northwest New Territories with Hong Kong Island. Other major structures on the road include the Tai Lam Tunnel, the Cheung Tsing Tunnel, the Cheung Tsing Bridge and the Western Harbour Crossing. The Ting Kau Bridge carries the heaviest traffic volume of the bridges on the Lantau Link, with many container trucks travelling between mainland China and the Hong Kong container port. A chromatic study and specially designed architectural lighting are intended to set the bridge off in its surroundings.

== Design ==
Ting Kau Contractors Joint Venture designed and built Ting Kau Bridge between 1995 and 1998. The joint venture consisted of lead partners Cubiertas Y Mzov (22%) and Entrecanales Y Tavora (22%), both of Spain (now both part of Acciona, S.A); Germany's Ed. Züblin (22%); Australia's Downer and Co (22%); and Hong Kong's Paul Y (12%). Constructing engineers were Schlaich Bergermann & Partner.

The design and construction cost of the bridge was HK$1.94 billion. It is one of the longest cable-stayed bridges in the world. Along with the Tsing Ma and Kap Shui Mun bridges, it is closely monitored by the Wind and Structural Health Monitoring System (WASHMS).

Ting Kau Bridge is the world's first major 4-span cable-stayed bridge. This meant that the central tower had to be stabilised longitudinally, which was accomplished using the longest cable stays ever used in a bridge (465 m (1,526 ft)). The design of this bridge contains special features such as single leg towers, which are stabilised by transverse cables like the masts of a sailboat. The Ting Kau Bridge and approach viaducts link the western New Territories and the mainland to the Lantau Fixed Crossing expressway, which connects the airport to Kowloon and Hong Kong. It meets the Lantau Fixed Crossing on Tsing Yi Island, 500 metres (1,600 ft) from the Tsing Ma Bridge.

The Ting Kau Bridge and Approach Viaduct are 1,875 metres (6,152 ft) long while the triple Tower Bridge has an overall length of 1,177 metres (3,862 ft). The three towers were specially designed to withstand extreme wind and typhoon conditions, and have heights of 170 metres (560 ft), 194 metres (636 ft), and 158 metres (518 ft), located on the Ting Kau headland, on a reclaimed island in Rambler Channel (which is 900 metres (3,000 ft) wide), and on the northwest Tsing Yi shoreline, respectively. The arrangement of separate decks on both sides of the 3 towers contributes to the slender appearance of the bridge, while helping it act favourably under heavy wind and typhoon loads. Each deck carries 3 traffic lanes and a hard shoulder.

== Smart system ==
A smart highway system was to become operational at Ting Kau Bridge in late December 2024, which could detect traffic accidents, and make appropriate arrangements to ensure a smooth traffic flow.

== Measurements ==
- Total length: 1,177 metres (3,862 ft)
- Length of main spans: 448 metres (1,470 ft) and 475 metres (1,558 ft)
- Main tower height: 201.55 metres (661.3 ft)
- Ting Kau tower height: 173.30 metres (568.6 ft)
- Tsing Yi tower height: 163.30 metres (535.8 ft)
- Deck surface area: 46,000 square metres (500,000 sq ft)
- Deck cable steel weight: 2,800 tonnes
- Structural steel deck weight: 8,900 tonnes
- Weight of concrete panels 29,000 tonnes
- Distance of wind give: 0.5 metres (1.6 ft)
- Reinforcement deck: 90 kilograms per square metre (18 lb/sq ft)
- Reinforcement towers: 200 kilograms per square metre (41 lb/sq ft)
- Span lengths: 127, 448, 475 and 127 metres (417, 1,470, 1,558 and 417 ft)
- Number of stay cables: 384
- Movements
  - Vertical at mid-span: 1.6 metres (5.2 ft)
  - Lateral at mid-span: 0.4 metres (1.3 ft)
  - Longitudinal at End Pier or Tsing Yi Abutment: 390 millimetres (15 in)

== See also ==
- Transport in Hong Kong

Preceded by Cheung Tsing Highway	Hong Kong Route 3 Ting Kau Bridge	Succeeded by Tai Lam Tunnel
