= West Kowloon Highway =

Expressway in Kowloon, Hong Kong

Coordinates: 22.32700°N 114.15233°E

West Kowloon Highway
- Part of Route 3
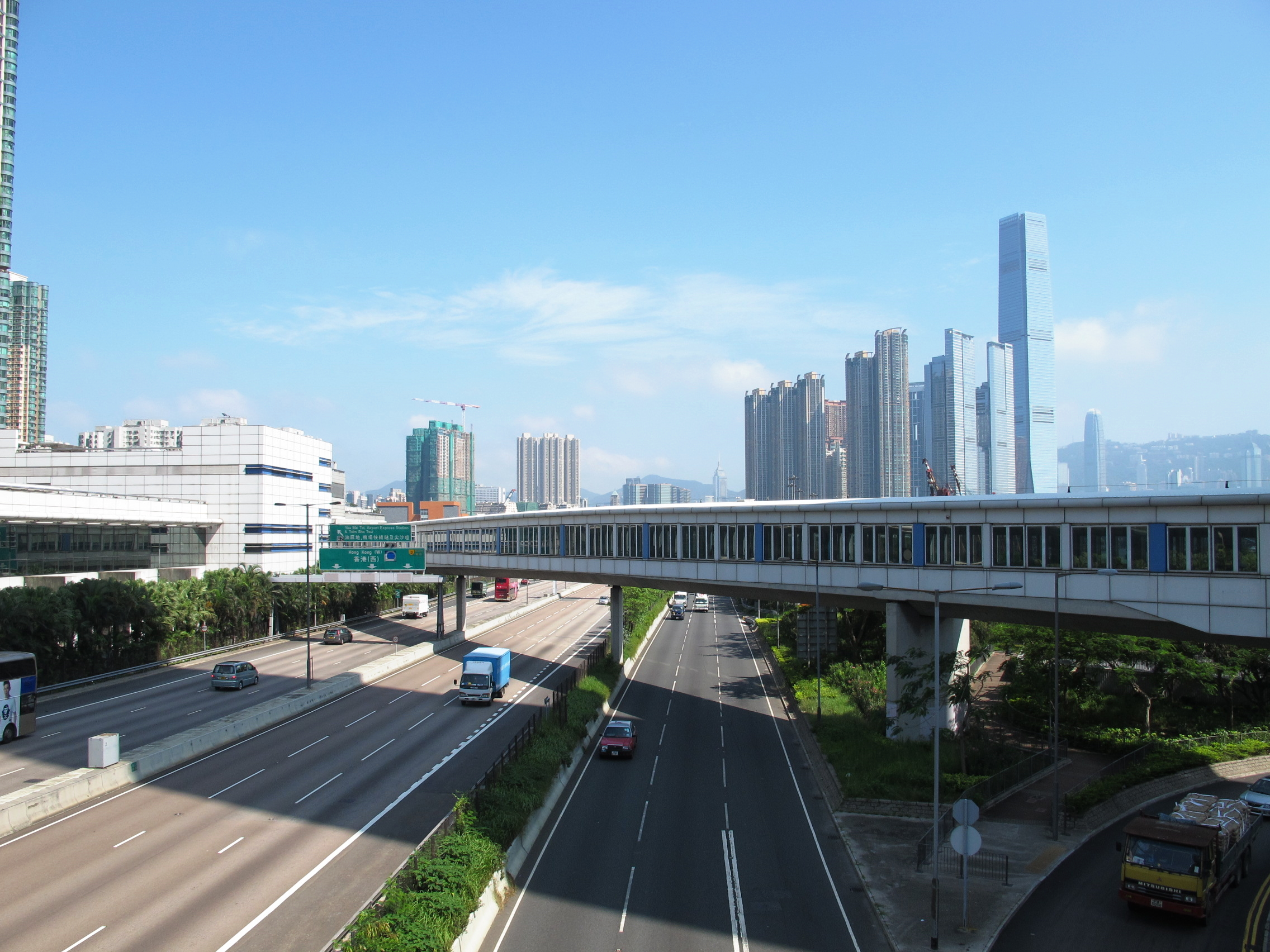
- West Kowloon Highway, near Olympic station

Route information
- Maintained by Highways Department
- Length: 5 km (3.1 mi)
- Existed: 1997–present
- Restrictions: Speed limit: Yau Ma Tei Interchange - 80 km/h Rest of the road - 100 km/h

Major junctions
- North end: Tsing Kwai Highway
- South end: Western Harbour Crossing

Location
- Country: China
- Special administrative region: Hong Kong

Highway system
- Transport in Hong Kong; Routes; Roads and Streets

West Kowloon Highway
- Traditional Chinese: 西九龍公路
Transcriptions
Standard Mandarin
- Hanyu Pinyin: Xī Jiǔlóng Gōnglù
Yue: Cantonese
- Yale Romanization: Sai1 gau2 lung4 gung1 lou6

West Kowloon Highway is a section of Route 3 in Hong Kong, built as part of the Airport Core Programme. This dual-three-lane expressway runs for 4.2 km (2.6 mi), connecting Western Harbour Crossing in the south with Tsing Kwai Highway in the north. While the southern section of the road is at grade, the northern part is on a viaduct in order to accommodate the MTR Tung Chung line and the Airport Express.

It is not to be confused with the older West Kowloon Corridor (currently part of Route 5), which is partly parallel to the West Kowloon Highway.

This expressway originally had a speed limit of 80 km/h (50 mph), but it was increased to 100 km/h (60 mph) because of the smooth shape of the road.

== History ==
The highway was constructed as part of the Airport Core Programme; a major function of the new highway was to facilitate access to the new Hong Kong International Airport from Hong Kong Island and Kowloon. It was built entirely on the West Kowloon Reclamation, an area of artificial land reclaimed from Victoria Harbour, also under the Airport Core Programme.

The road design and engineering consultancy was awarded to Freeman Fox Maunsell in 1990.

The northern section (between Kwai Chung and Cherry Street in Tai Kok Tsui) was built by a consortium comprising Kumagai Gumi, Maeda Corporation, and China Road and Bridge Corporation. The southern section (between Tai Kok Tsui and the Western Harbour Crossing toll plaza) was constructed by Aoki Corporation. The two contracts commenced on 2 August 1993 and 31 August 1993 respectively.

The road was opened on 19 February 1997.

== See also ==
- List of streets and roads in Hong Kong

Preceded by Western Harbour Crossing	Hong Kong Route 3 West Kowloon Highway	Succeeded by Tsing Kwai Highway
