= Cheung Tsing Bridge =

Bridge in New Territories, Hong Kong

Coordinates: 22°20′58″N 114°6′48.4″E

Cheung Tsing Bridge
- Part of Route 3

Route information
- Maintained by Highways Department
- Length: 0.5 km (0.31 mi; 1,600 ft)
- History: Built 1997

Major junctions
- East end: Tsing Yi
- West end: Ha Kwai Chung

Location
- Country: China
- Special administrative region: Hong Kong

Highway system
- Transport in Hong Kong; Routes; Roads and Streets

Cheung Tsing Bridge
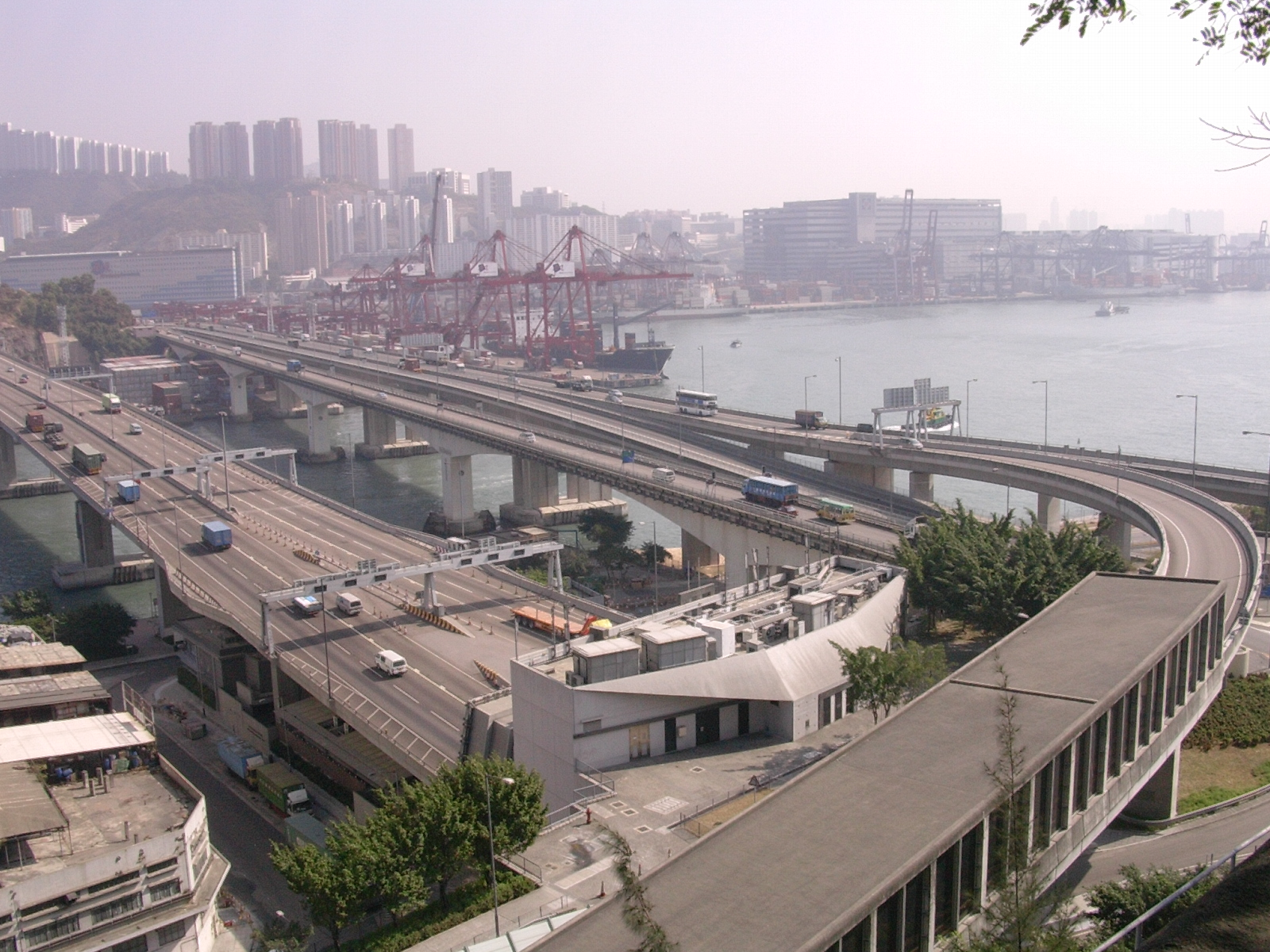
- Cheung Tsing Bridge is on the left. Taken in December 2004.
- Traditional Chinese: 長青橋
- Simplified Chinese: 长青桥
Transcriptions
Standard Mandarin
- Hanyu Pinyin: Chángqīng Qiáo
Yue: Cantonese
- Yale Romanization: cheung4 ching1 kiu4
- Jyutping: ceong4 cing1 kiu4

Rambler Channel Bridge
- Traditional Chinese: 藍巴勒海峽大橋
- Simplified Chinese: 蓝巴勒海峡大桥
Transcriptions
Yue: Cantonese
- Jyutping: laam4 baa1 laak6 hoi2 haap3 daai6 kiu4

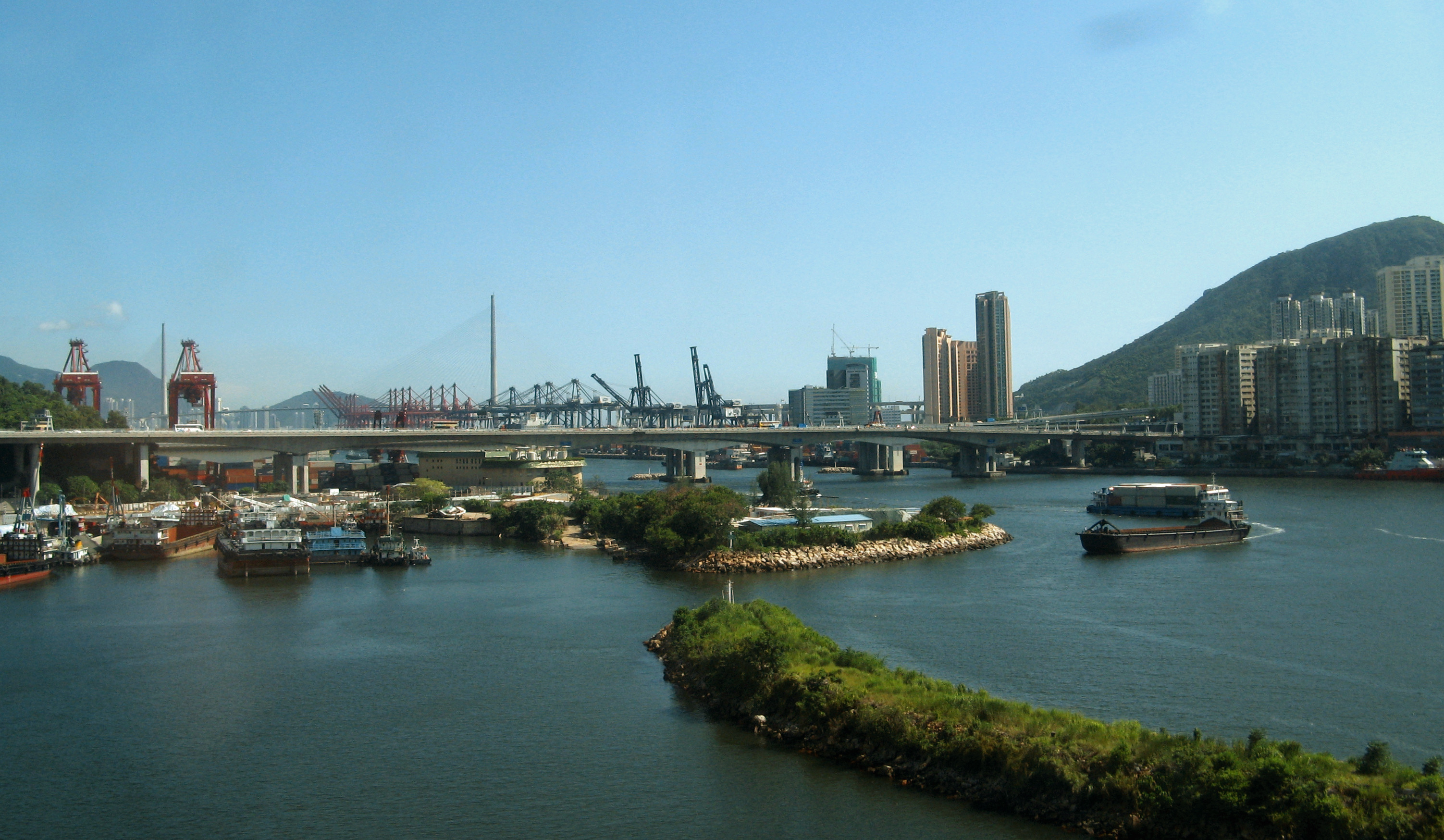
Cheung Tsing Bridge, side view in August 2011

Cheung Tsing Bridge, formerly Rambler Channel Bridge, is a bridge crossing Rambler Channel in Hong Kong, connecting Cheung Tsing Tunnel on Tsing Yi Island and Kwai Chung section of Tsing Kwai Highway. It is part of Tsing Kwai Highway of Route 3. It is also a part of the Airport Core Programme, being a part of Route 3.

Built next to Tsing Yi Bridge, Cheung Tsing Bridge is the second bridge to connect Kwai Chung and Tsing Yi. Duplicate Tsing Yi South Bridge was built afterwards in 1999.

The bridge was later given the name Cheung Tsing because of its proximity to Cheung Ching Estate and Cheung Tsing Tunnel.

Preceded by Tsing Kwai Highway	Hong Kong Route 3 Cheung Tsing Bridge	Succeeded by Cheung Tsing Tunnel
