= Tsing Kwai Highway =

Road in Hong Kong

Coordinates: 22.3419°N 114.1272°E

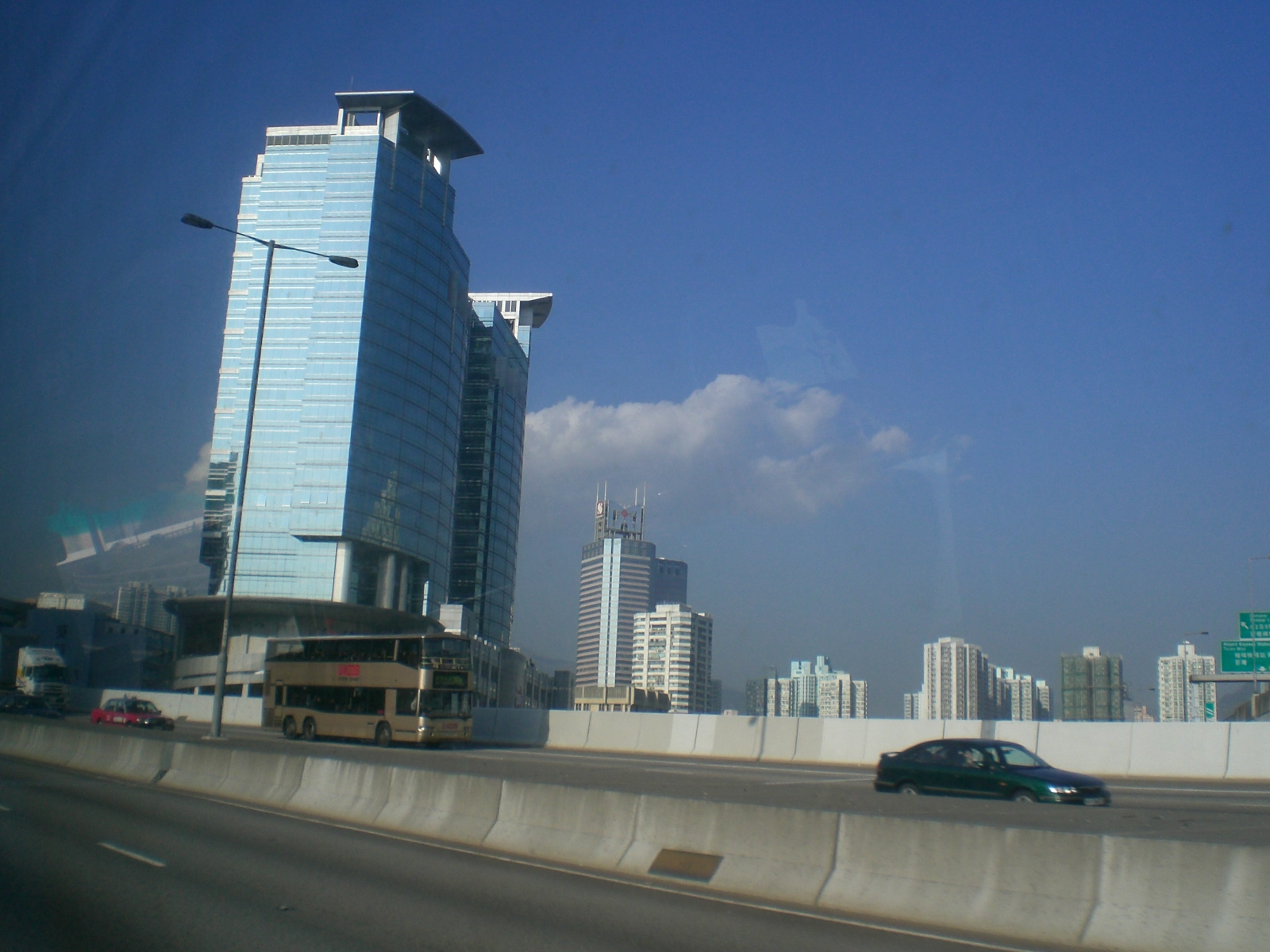
Tsing Kwai Highway

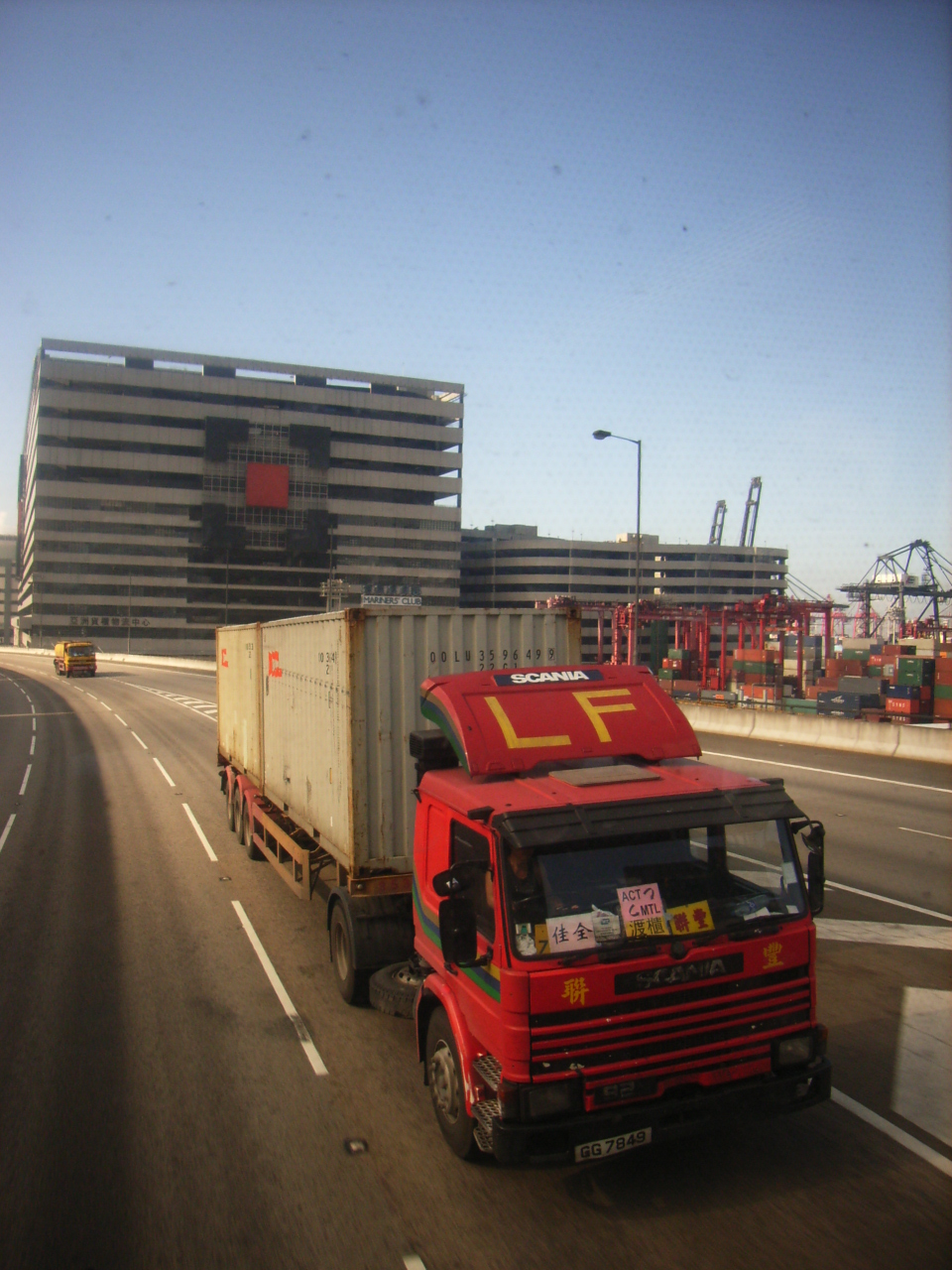

Tsing Kwai Highway (Chinese: 青葵公路; Jyutping: cing1 kwai4 gung1 lou6) is a section of Route 3 in Hong Kong, previously known as Route 3 – Kwai Chung Section. From its junction with West Kowloon Highway at Mei Foo Roundabout, the expressway runs in the form of a three-kilometre dual-four-lane viaduct atop Kwai Chung Road and Kwai Tai Road, circumscribing the container terminals to reach the Rambler Channel. Then, the highway crosses the channel along a 500-m bridge known as Cheung Tsing Bridge (or Rambler Channel Bridge), and ends at its junction with the Cheung Tsing Tunnel. Tsing Kwai Highway was opened on 19 February 1997.

== See also ==
- List of streets and roads in Hong Kong

Other highways in Kowloon and New Territories:

- West Kowloon Highway – Route 3
- Tsing Long Highway – Route 3
- Tate's Cairn Highway – Route 2
- Cheung Tsing Highway – Route 3
- Route 2 (Hong Kong)
- Route 3 (Hong Kong)

Preceded by West Kowloon Highway	Hong Kong Route 3 Tsing Kwai Highway	Succeeded by Cheung Tsing Highway
