= Kap Shui Mun Bridge =

Overpass in western Hong Kong

Kap Shui Mun Bridge 汲水門大橋
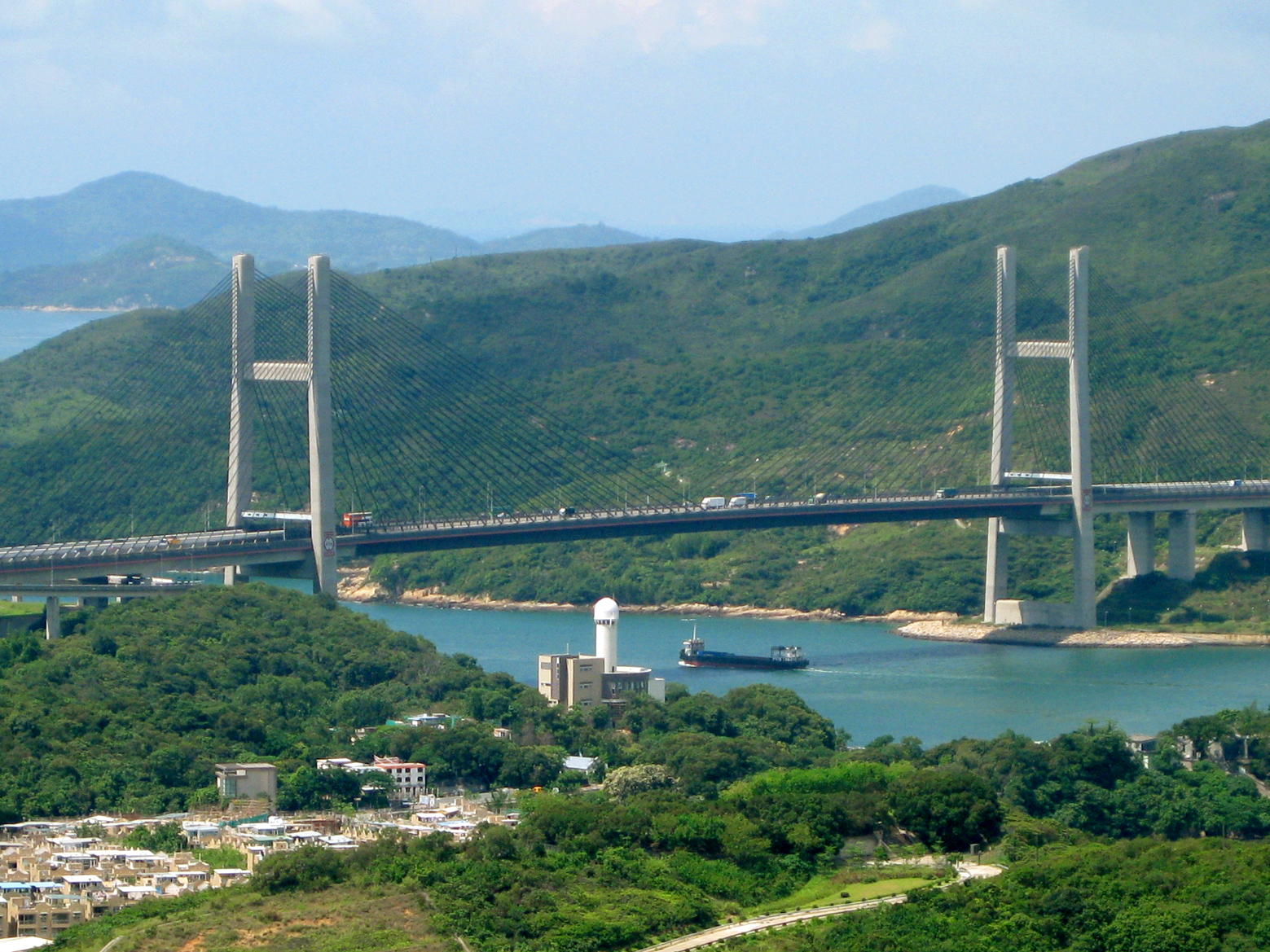
- Kap Shui Mun Bridge, with Ma Wan in the foreground
- Coordinates: 22°20′39″N 114°03′19″E
- Carries: 6 lanes of roadway (upper); 2 MTR rail lines, 2 lanes of roadway (lower)
- Crosses: Kap Shui Mun
- Locale: Lantau and Ma Wan
- Other name(s): KSMB
- Maintained by: Tsing Ma Management Limited: operation and maintenance contractor for the Tsing Ma Control Area; under contract to the Highways Department of the Government of Hong Kong

Characteristics
- Design: Double-decked cable-stayed bridge
- Total length: 750 metres (2,460 ft)
- Width: 32.5 metres (107 ft)
- Longest span: 430 metres (1,410 ft)
- Clearance below: 47 metres (154 ft)

History
- Opened: 22 May 1997; 28 years ago

Statistics
- Toll: No (Since 27 December 2020)

Kap Shui Mun Bridge
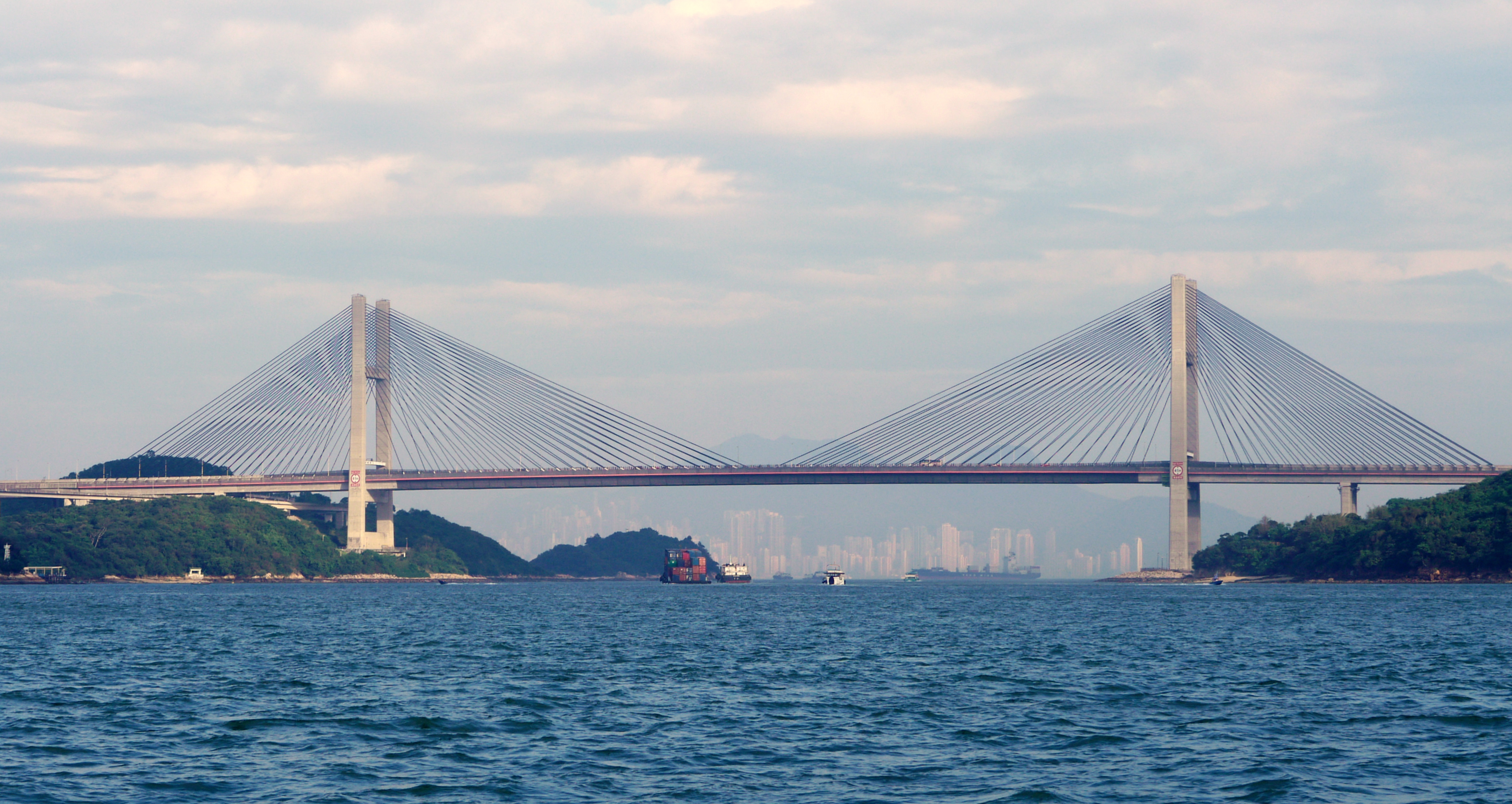
- Kap Shui Mun Bridge
- Traditional Chinese: 汲水門大橋
- Simplified Chinese: 汲水门大桥
Transcriptions
Standard Mandarin
- Hanyu Pinyin: Jíshuǐmén Dàqiáo
Yue: Cantonese
- Yale Romanization: kap^{1} seui^{2} mun^{4} daai^{6} kiu^{4}

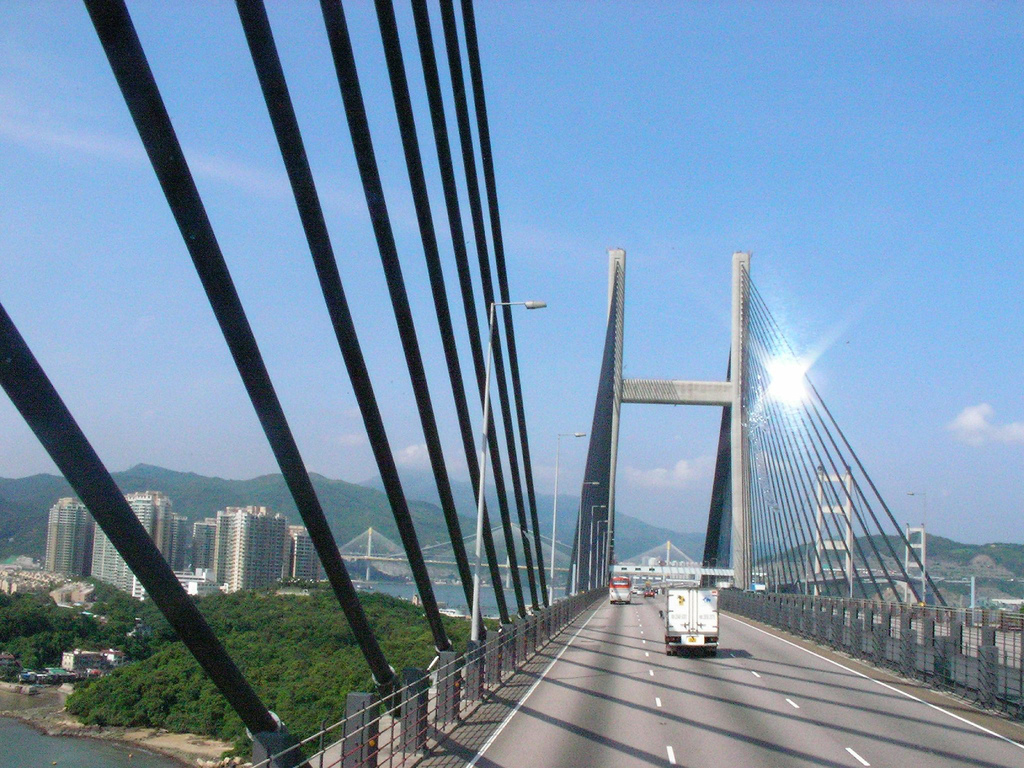
Kap Shui Mun Bridge

The Kap Shui Mun Bridge (KSMB) in Hong Kong, part of Lantau Link of Route 8, is one of the longest cable-stayed bridges in the world that transports both road and railway traffic, with the upper deck used for motor vehicles and the lower deck for both vehicles and the MTR. It has a main span of 430 metres (1,410 ft) and an overall length of 750 metres (2,460 ft). It spans the Kap Shui Mun marine channel between Ma Wan and Lantau islands and has a vertical clearance of 47 metres (154 ft) above sea level. The bridge was completed in 1997.

== Structural information ==
Main span	430 m (1,410 ft)
Side spans	Two 80 m (260 ft) spans each side
Lantau Approach Span	70 m (230 ft)
Ma Wan Viaduct	503 m (1,650 ft)
Overall length	1,323 m (4,341 ft)
Height of towers	150 m (490 ft)
Navigation clearance	47 m (154 ft)

The total length of the Kap Shui Mun Bridge includes a 70-metre (230 ft) approach span on the Lantau side. There is a column in each of the back spans of the cable stayed bridge, making four 80-metre (260 ft) spans, adding to the 430-metre (1,410 ft) main span. This makes the total length 820 metres (2,690 ft). The 503-metre (1,650 ft) Ma Wan Viaduct was constructed under the same contract as the KSMB. The viaduct connects the KSMB to the Tsing Ma Bridge, forming the Lantau Link, which was built to provide access to the new airport. The navigation clearance of 47 metres (154 ft) is part of the reason that the H-shaped towers are 150 metres (490 ft) tall.

The Kap Shui Mun Bridge is not symmetrical, in that the 160-metre (520 ft) back span length (two 80-metre (260 ft) spans) is less than half of the main span length (which would be 215 metres (705 ft)). To provide the balance that symmetry will normally provide, part of the bridge has a composite structure. The center 387 metres (1,270 ft) of the main span uses a steel-concrete composite to make the structure lighter. The back spans and the rest of the main span are concrete. Using the lighter steel cross section in the majority of the main span serves to equalize the horizontal forces on the towers and balance the bridge.

Because the lower deck carries both rail and traffic, the cross section is designed as a Vierendeel truss. This means that there are no diagonal members in the cross section and that vehicles and rail cars drive through the openings provided by the Vierendeel design.

Along with the Tsing Ma Bridge and Ting Kau Bridge, it is closely monitored by the Wind and Structural Health Monitoring System (WASHMS).

Stay cables
Number	8 X 22 = 176
Total length of stay cables	11 km (6.8 mi)

Movement
Vertical, at midspan	470 mm (19 in)
Lateral, at midspan	155 mm (6.1 in)
Longitudinal, at Pier 1	320 mm (13 in)

Concrete strength of towers: Grade 50/20 or 50MPa

== Crane strike ==
The bridge has a height restriction of 41 metres for vessels passing underneath. On 23 October 2015, a barge attempted to pass under the bridge with a broken-down crane that could not be lowered. The crane had a maximum height of 43 metres, but was tilted slightly to 41 metres. The bridge has an actual clearance of 47 metres, but potentially due to the high tide and wave action, the crane struck the bridge and damaged its underside. The Tsing Ma Bridge has a higher height clearance of 53 metres but a source said the captain of the tugboat towing the barge may have opted to take Kap Shui Mun to save time.

The strike triggered the Ship Impact Detection System to issue an alarm and both the road and railway were shut down immediately, severing Lantau Island and the airport from the city from about 7:40 pm to 10:00 pm. The government's contingency plan to implement emergency ferry service between Tsuen Wan and Tung Chung failed as the ferry operator took almost two hours to ready the service. Some travelers attempted to reach the airport via the Discovery Bay Ferry Pier, although many missed their flights.

The Highways Department inspected the bridge and found that only the inspection platform rails were damaged by the collision, and that the structural integrity of the bridge was not jeopardised. In the days following the incident there were calls in local media for the government to build a second link to the airport. In fact, such a link was already under construction: the Tuen Mun–Chek Lap Kok Link road tunnel was being constructed as part of the Hong Kong–Zhuhai–Macau Bridge project. This opened in 2020.

== See also ==
- List of tunnels and bridges in Hong Kong

Preceded by Ma Wan Viaduct	Hong Kong Route 8 Kap Shui Mun Bridge	Succeeded by North Lantau Highway
