= Highways Department =

Department of the Hong Kong Government

- 路政署

Agency overview
- Formed: 1986
- Headquarters: Ho Man Tin Government Offices, 88 Chung Hau Street, Ho Man Tin, Kowloon
- Employees: 2 510 (Mar 2022)
- Annual budget: HK$4,270 million (2022-23 FY)
- Agency executive: Chan Pai Ming Jimmy, from 20 Dec 2018, Director of Highways
- Website: www.hyd.gov.hk

Highways Department
- Chinese: 路政署
Transcriptions
Standard Mandarin
- Hanyu Pinyin: Lùzhèngshǔ
Yue: Cantonese
- Yale Romanization: Louh Jing Chyúh
- Jyutping: lou^{6} zing^{3} cyu^{5}

Highways Department is a government agency under the Transport and Logistics Bureau of the Government of Hong Kong. It is responsible for developing Hong Kong's road and railway network as well as road maintenance.

== History ==
The department was previously an office within the former Civil Engineering Department and became an independent department on 1 June 1986 due to the increasingly complex road network in Hong Kong.

In 2024, it launched street signs with a new font to "infuse a strong cultural atmosphere into the community's landscape" to support the government's Task Force on District Governance, with the new font drawing criticism.

== Directors ==
- Harold Campbell Beaton (1986–1989)
- Kwei See Kan (1989–1993)
- Kwong Hon Sang (1993–1996)
- Leung Kwok Sun (1996–2000)
- Lo Yiu Ching (2000–2002)
- Mak Chai Kwong (2002–2006)
- Wai Chi Sing (2006–2010)
- Peter Lau Ka Keung (2010–2016)
- Daniel Chung Kum-wah (2016–2018)
- Jimmy Chan Pai Ming (2018–present)

== See also ==
- Civil Engineering and Development Department
- Transport Department
- Hong Kong Strategic Route and Exit Number System
