= Tsing Sha Highway =

Road in Hong Kong

Coordinates: 22.332784°N 114.144373°E

Tsing Sha Highway
- Part of Route 8
- Tsing Sha Highway coloured red

Route information
- Maintained by Highways Department
- Length: 15.0 km (9.3 mi) 14.5 km (9.01 mi) eastbound
- Existed: 2008–present

Major junctions
- East end: Sha Tin (near Tai Wai)
- 10 in total; Route 9 at Sha Tin; Route 7 at Lai Chi Kok; Route 3 at Cheung Sha Wan and Tsing Yi
- West end: Tsing Yi

Location
- Country: China
- Special administrative region: Hong Kong

Highway system
- Transport in Hong Kong; Routes; Roads and Streets

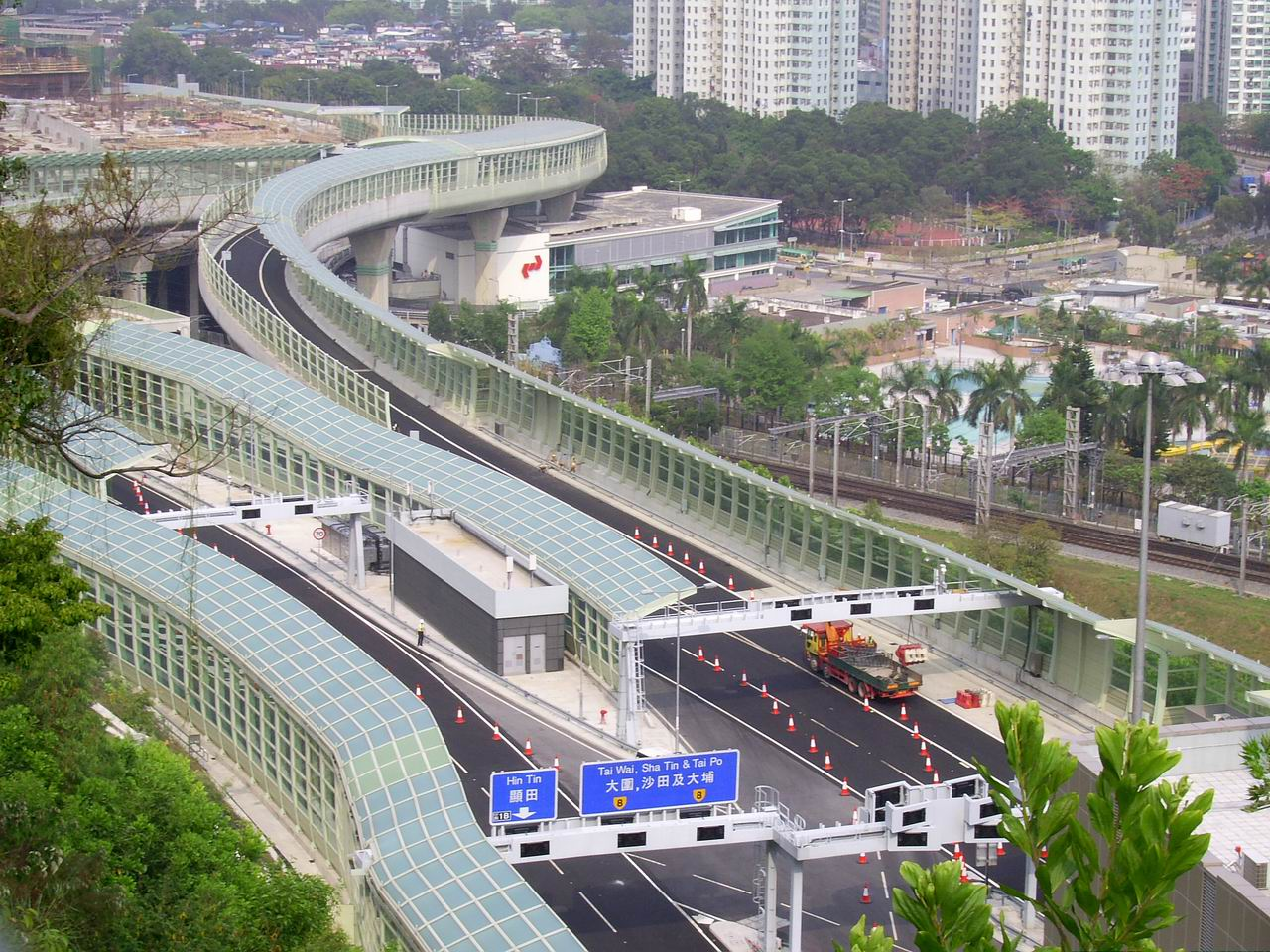
Tsing Sha Highway near Tai Wai in March 2008

Tsing Sha Highway (Chinese: 青沙公路) is a major expressway in Hong Kong, which links the island of Tsing Yi to Sha Tin. The road is part of Route 8, which starts in Sha Tin and terminates in Tung Chung. It was opened in March 2008 and extended in December 2009.

== History ==
Tsing Sha Highway was built in three stages.

The section that is known as Route T3 is in Tai Wai. The contract was awarded on 16 March 2003 and construction commenced on 26 March 2003. The southbound bridge was completed on 23 November 2005, and the northbound bridge in March 2008. This section cost approximately HK$2,120.2 million to build. This section has two exits; 1 and 1A.

The section between the end of Road T3 and Stonecutters Island commenced construction in November 2002 and was opened on 21 March 2008. It includes the Tai Wai Tunnel, the Sha Tin Heights Tunnel and the Eagle's Nest Tunnel. This section has five exits; 1B, 1C, 2A, 2B and 2C.

The section between Stonecutters Island and Tsing Yi commenced construction in April 2002 and was opened on 20 December 2009. It includes the Stonecutters Bridge and the Nam Wan Tunnel. This section has three exits; 2D, 3 and 3A. Before this section was completed, all cars continuing with Tsing Sha Highway have taken exit 2C and so those cars who wish to go to Lantau should use exit 2A.

== Alignment ==
The road starts off in Sha Tin at an intersection with Tai Po Road – Sha Tin, then heads southwest towards Cheung Sha Wan through the Tai Wai Tunnel, Sha Tin Heights Tunnel and Eagle's Nest Tunnel.

After passing through the Eagle's Nest Tunnel, the road interchanges with Ching Cheung Road of Route 7. The road then goes into a flyover, passing over Cheung Sha Wan. At this point the road interchanges at Lai Wan Interchange with Tsing Kwai Highway and West Kowloon Highway of Route 3.

The road continues as a flyover across Stonecutters Island, then turns onto the Stonecutters Bridge towards Tsing Yi. After arriving at Tsing Yi, the road goes through the Nam Wan Tunnel, passing under Tsing Yi's hills, then comes out on the other side of Tsing Yi. The road intersects with Route 3 again at North West Tsing Yi Interchange, and then terminates, leading on to the Lantau Link.

According to the road signs, the speed limit for the section on the north of the toll plaza is 70 km/h, while at the south of the toll plaza the speed limit is increased to 80 km/h.

== Interchanges ==
Tsing Sha Highway
Eastbound exits	Exit number	Westbound exits
End of Route 8 intersects with Shing Mun Tunnel Road
End Tsing Sha Highway		Start Tsing Sha Highway
Sha Tin T3
Tai Wai, Tsuen Wan; Tai Po Road – Tai Wai, Shing Mun Tunnel Road	1	Tai Wai; Chik Wan Street
no exit	1A	Tai Po Road; Tai Po Road – Sha Tin Heights
Tai Wai Tunnel
Hin Tin; Che Kung Miu Road	1B	no exit
Sha Tin Heights Tunnel
Eagle's Nest Tunnel
no exit	1C	Kwai Chung; Ching Cheung Road
Lai Chi Kok Flyover
no exit	2A	LAI WAN INTERCHANGE; Kowloon (W), Hong Kong, Kwai Chung, Container Terminals 1–8; Lin Cheung Road (access road to Tsing Kwai Highway and Western Harbour Crossing ), Mei Ching Road, Lai Po Road
Tsim Sha Tsui, Hong Kong; West Kowloon Highway	2B	no exit
Ngong Shuen Chau Viaduct
no exit	2C	Stonecutters Island, Container Terminal 8 Container Port Road South, Chi Ngong Road
Stonecutters Island, Container Terminal 8 Container Port Road South, Hing Wah Street West	2D	no exit
Stonecutters Bridge
Tsing Yi East Viaduct
Tsing Yi, Container Terminal 9 Tsing Yi Road, Tsing Yi Hong Wan Road	3	Tsing Yi, Container Terminal 9 Tsing Yi Road, Tsing Yi Hong Wan Road
Nam Wan Tunnel
Tsing Yi West Viaduct
no exit	3A	North West Tsing Yi Interchange; Yuen Long, Tuen Mun; Tsing Long Highway
Start Tsing Sha Highway		End Tsing Sha Highway continues on as Lantau Link

== Tai Wai Tunnel ==
The shortest of the three tunnels on Route T3 of the main Route 8 and runs from Shatin to Hin Tin.

Tai Wai Tunnel
Overview
- Status: Active
- System: Part of Route 8

Operation
- Opened: 21 March 2008; 17 years ago
- Owner: Hong Kong Government
- Traffic: Vehicular

Technical
- Length: 0.5 kilometres (0.31 mi)
- Operating speed: 70 kilometres per hour (43 mph)

Preceded by Eastern Terminus	Hong Kong Route 8 Tsing Sha Highway	Succeeded by Lantau Link
