= Route 8 (Hong Kong) =

Road in Hong Kong

Route 8

- Alignment and exits of Route 8 (zoom in to view exit details)

Route information
- Maintained by Highways Department
- Length: 33.1 km (20.6 mi) 32.6 kilometres (20.3 mi) eastbound
- Existed: 1997–present

Major junctions
- East end: Route 9 in Sha Tin Town Centre
- Route 7 near Lai Chi Kok; Route 3 in Cheung Sha Wan; Route 3 in Tsing Yi; Penny's Bay Highway near Sunny Bay/Yam O
- West end: Airport Road near Hong Kong International Airport

Location
- Country: China
- Special administrative region: Hong Kong
- Districts: Sha Tin, Sham Shui Po, Kwai Tsing, Tsuen Wan, Islands

Highway system
- Transport in Hong Kong; Routes; Roads and Streets
← Route 7	→ Route 9

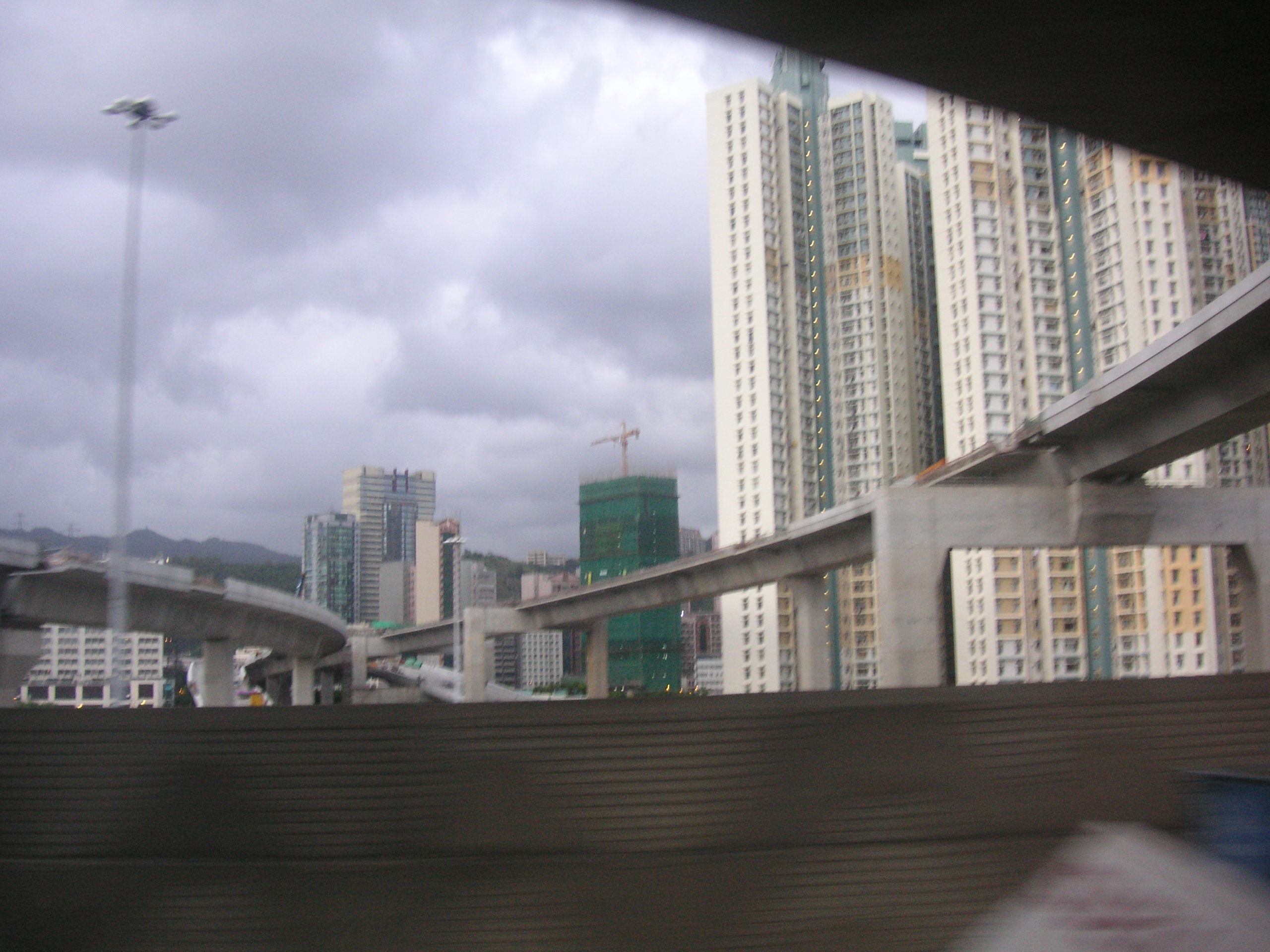
Knitting bridges interchange of Route 8 and Route 3 at the border of Cheung Sha Wan and Lai Chi Kok

Route 8 (Chinese: 八號幹線) of Hong Kong is a dual 3-lane carriageway motorway that links Lantau Island, Tsing Yi Island, Cheung Sha Wan in West Kowloon, and Sha Tin in the southeast New Territories of Hong Kong. It is a combination of many sections.

The section from Lantau to Tsing Yi is made up of the existing North Lantau Highway and Lantau Link, which opened in 1997. Route 8 becomes Airport Road at Chek Lap Kok.

The section between Tsing Yi and Cheung Sha Wan, formerly known as Route 9, is a 7.6 km (4.7 mi) dual 3-lane expressway. This section consists of the Stonecutters Bridge, which spans the Rambler Channel from Stonecutters Island and links with the Lantau Link through the Nam Wan Tunnel and West Tsing Yi viaduct and was opened on 20 December 2009. This section provides traffic with a more direct route to the Lantau Link, particularly vehicles from Tsim Sha Tsui and Western Harbour Crossing, previously vehicles had to use Route 3 (Cheung Tsing Bridge and Cheung Tsing Tunnel).

The remaining section links Cheung Sha Wan and Tai Wai, formerly known as Route 16. It is composed of the Eagle's Nest Tunnel and Sha Tin Heights Tunnel, totalling 6.7 km (4.2 mi) in length and connecting Route 9 at its Sha Tin terminus. It was opened on 21 March 2008.

Areas passed through by Route 8 include Hong Kong International Airport, Tung Chung, Hong Kong Disneyland, Ma Wan, Tsing Yi, West Kowloon, and Sha Tin.

Route 8 also connects with Route 3, Route 7, and Route 9.

== History ==
The current Route 8 section was planned in 1990, in line with the Airport Core Programme. The section from Chek Lap Kok to Tsing Yi is called Route 9; the section from Tsing Yi to Sha Tin is called Route 16. The former was opened to traffic on 22 May 1997, including North Lantau Highway, Kap Shui Mun Bridge and Tsing Ma Bridge.

In November 2002, the construction of Route 16 (now Route 8 from Tsing Yi section to Sha Tin section) began. On 31 January 2004, according to the Third generation of Route number system, Route 9 and Route 16 were merged into Route 8. Among them, the Nam Wan Tunnel was completed as early as 25 February 2005, but it was opened to traffic only in 2009 after the completion of the Stonecutters Bridge; until then traffic would have to use Route 3 (including the Cheung Tsing Highway, Cheung Tsing Tunnel and Cheung Tsing Bridge) which linked the two discontinuous segments of Route 8.

In 2008, the section between Cheung Sha Wan and Sha Tin of Route 8 was completed and was named Tsing Sha Highway. The Community Chest held the New Territories Million Walk on this section on February 24. The Tsing Sha Highway was opened to traffic on March 21.

In 2009, the section between Cheung Sha Wan and Tsing Yi section of Route 8 was completed, and the Community Chest held a million trip on the Stonecutters Bridge and the Nam Wan Tunnel on 15 November. The remaining section of the Tsing Sha Highway was opened to traffic on 20 December, and the same day also marked the full completion of Route 8.

== Observed roads and exits ==
District	Location	Road Name	km	mi	Exit	Destinations	Notes
Sha Tin District	Tai Wai	Joins Route 9 (Tai Po Road - Sha Tin)					
Sha Tin District	Tai Wai	Tsing Sha Highway	1.2	0.7	1	Mei Tin Road - Tai Wai, Tsuen Wan via Route 9 (Shing Mun Tunnel)	Eastbound exit only
Sha Tin District	Tai Wai	Tsing Sha Highway	1.2	0.7	1	Chik Wan Street - Tai Wai	Westbound exit only
Sha Tin District	Tai Wai	Tsing Sha Highway	1.2	0.7	1A	Tai Po Road	Westbound exit only
Sha Tin District	Tai Wai	Tsing Sha Highway	1.6–2.1	1.0–1.3	Tai Wai Tunnel		
Sha Tin District	Tai Wai	Tsing Sha Highway	2.2	1.4	1B	Che Kung Miu Road - Hin Tin, Tai Wai Station	Eastbound exit only
Sha Tin District	Butterfly Valley	Tsing Sha Highway	2.3–3.3	1.4–2.1	Sha Tin Heights Tunnel		
Sha Tin District	Butterfly Valley	Tsing Sha Highway	3.7–5.8	2.3–3.6	Eagle's Nest Tunnel (Tolled)		
Sham Shui Po District	Lai Chi Kok	Tsing Sha Highway	6.4	4.0	1C	Route 7 (Ching Cheung Road) - Kwai Chung, Princess Margaret Hospital (Hong Kong)	Westbound exit only
Sham Shui Po District	Lai Chi Kok	Tsing Sha Highway	7.2	4.5	2A	Lin Cheung Road - Cheung Sha Wan, Lai Chi Kok, Hong Kong (West)	Westbound exit only
Sham Shui Po District	Lai Chi Kok	Tsing Sha Highway	7.8	4.8	2B	Lin Cheung Road - Tsim Sha Tsui, Hong Kong	Eastbound exit only
Sham Shui Po District	Stonecutters Island	Tsing Sha Highway	8.5	5.3	2C	Container Port Road South - Stonecutters Island	Westbound exit only
Sham Shui Po District	Stonecutters Island	Tsing Sha Highway	9.2	5.7	2D	Container Port Road South - Container Terminal 8, Lai Chi Kok, Cheung Sha Wan, Mong Kok	Eastbound exit only
Rambler Channel		Tsing Sha Highway	10.1–11.7	6.3–7.3	Stonecutters Bridge		
Kwai Tsing District	Tsing Yi	Tsing Sha Highway	11.9	7.4	3	Tsing Yi Road, Tsing Yi Hong Wan Road - Tsing Yi, Container Terminal 9	—
Kwai Tsing District	Tsing Yi	Tsing Sha Highway	12.6–13.8	7.8–8.6	Nam Wan Tunnel		
Kwai Tsing District	Tsing Yi	Cheung Tsing Highway	14.1	8.8	3A	Route 3 (Tsing Long Highway) - Yuen Long	Westbound exit only
Kwai Tsing District	Tsing Yi	North West Tsing Yi Interchange	15.5	9.6	4A	Route 3 (Cheung Tsing Highway) Eastbound - Container Terminal 1-7, Kowloon, Hong Kong	Eastbound exit only
Kwai Tsing District	Tsing Yi	North West Tsing Yi Interchange	15.9	9.9	4B	Tsing Yi North Coastal Road - Tsing Yi (North), Tsuen Wan, Sha Tin	Eastbound exit only
Kwai Tsing District	Tsing Yi	North West Tsing Yi Interchange	15.9	9.9	4B	Lantau Link Visitors Centre	Eastbound exit only
Kwai Tsing District	Tsing Yi	North West Tsing Yi Interchange	15.9	9.9	4B	Route 3 (Cheung Tsing Highway) Westbound - Yuen Long, Tuen Mun	Eastbound exit only
Ma Wan Channel		Lantau Link	15.9–17.9	9.9–11.1	Tsing Ma Bridge		
Tsuen Wan District	Ma Wan	Lantau Link	18.3	11.4	4C	Ma Wan Road - Ma Wan	Westbound exit only Permission required for access
Kap Shui Mun		Lantau Link	18.4–19.2	11.4–11.9	Kap Shui Mun Bridge		
Islands District	Yam O	North Lantau Highway	21.8	13.5	5	Penny's Bay Highway - Hong Kong Disneyland, Sunny Bay	—
Islands District	Siu Ho Wan	North Lantau Highway	27.7	17.2	5A	Shun Long Road - Tuen Mun, Zhuhai, Macao	Westbound exit only
Islands District	Siu Ho Wan	North Lantau Highway	28.3	17.6	6	Sham Shui Kok Drive - Siu Ho Wan Depot	Westbound exit only
Islands District	Siu Ho Wan	North Lantau Highway	29.7	18.4	6A	Shun Long Road - Tuen Mun, Zhuhai, Macao	Eastbound exit only
Islands District	Tung Chung	North Lantau Highway	31.6	19.6	6B	Yi Tung Road, Yu Tung Road - Tung Chung (West), North Lantau Hospital, Tung Chung Cable Car Terminal	Westbound exit only
Islands District	Tung Chung	North Lantau Highway	32.6	20.3	6C	Tung Chung Waterfront Road - Tung Chung (North), Tung Chung Cable Car Terminal	Westbound exit only
Islands District	Chek Lap Kok	Joins Airport Road					

== See also ==
- List of streets and roads in Hong Kong
- Lantau Link
- North Lantau Highway
- Tsing Yi North Coastal Road
