= North Lantau Highway =

Expressway in western Hong Kong

Coordinates: 22.3143°N 113.9924°E

North Lantau Highway
- Part of Route 8
- North Lantau Highway coloured red

Route information
- Maintained by Highways Department
- Length: 12.8 km (8.0 mi)
- Existed: 1997–present

Major junctions
- West end: Chek Lap Kok
- East end: Lantau (near Yam O)

Location
- Country: China
- Special administrative region: Hong Kong

Highway system
- Transport in Hong Kong; Routes; Roads and Streets

North Lantau Highway
- Traditional Chinese: 北大嶼山公路
- Simplified Chinese: 北大屿山公路
Transcriptions
Standard Mandarin
- Hanyu Pinyin: Běi Dàyǔshān Gōnglù
Hakka
- Romanization: Bet5 tai4 yi2 san1 gung1 lu4
Yue: Cantonese
- Yale Romanization: Bāk daaih yùh sāan gūng louh
- Jyutping: Bak1 daai6 jyu4 saan1 gung1 lou6

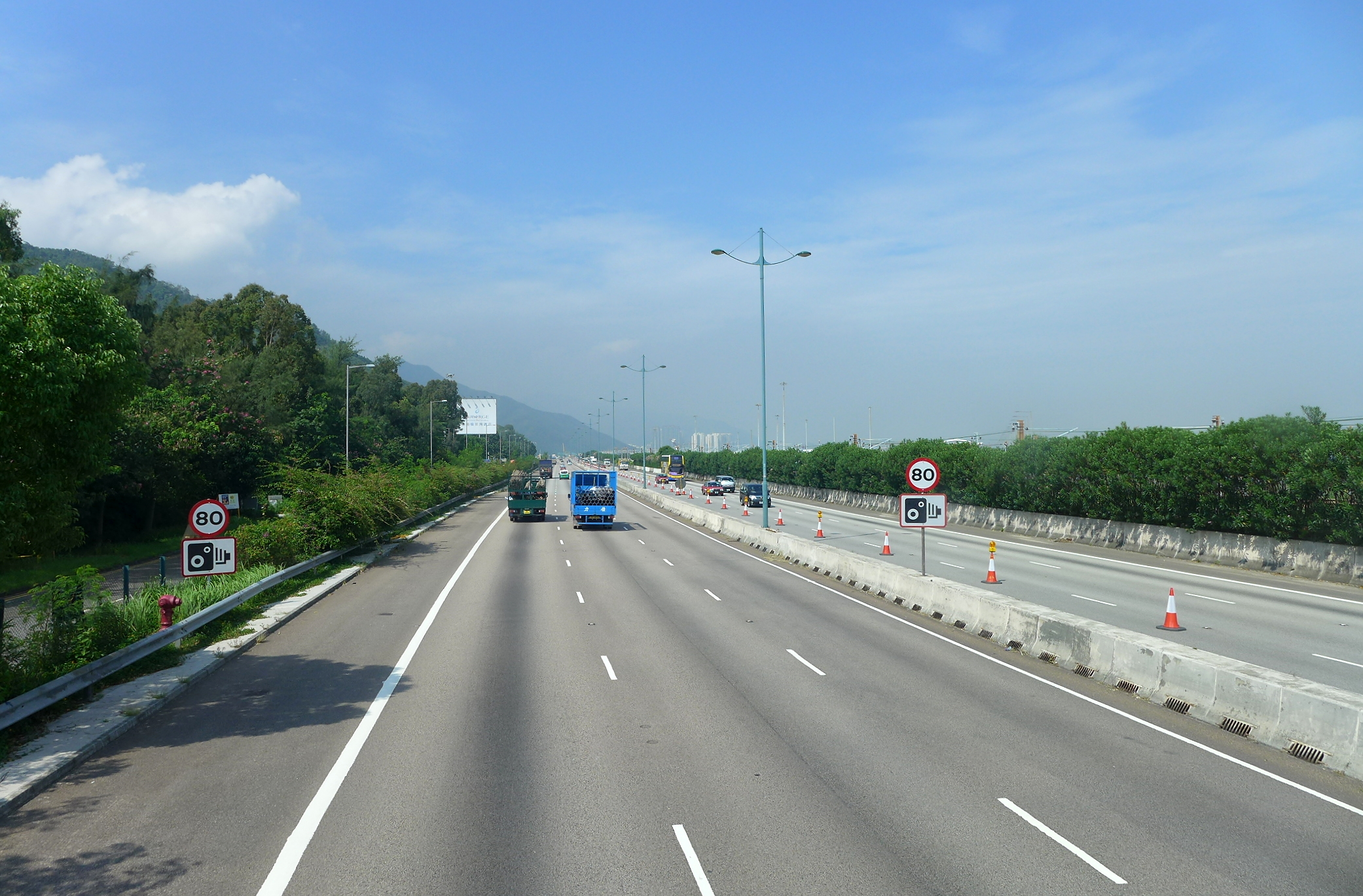
North Lantau Highway

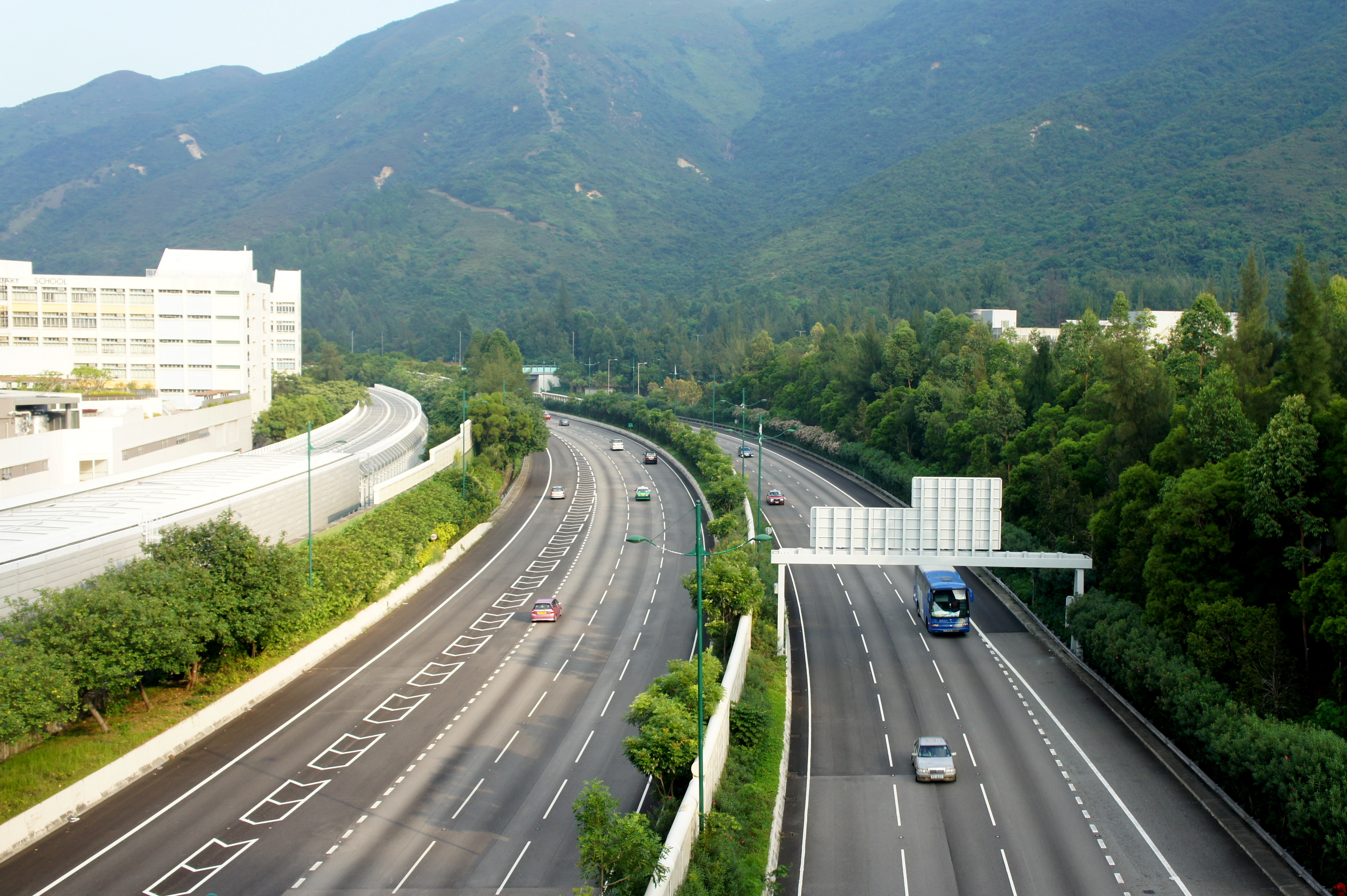
North Lantau Highway near Tung Chung

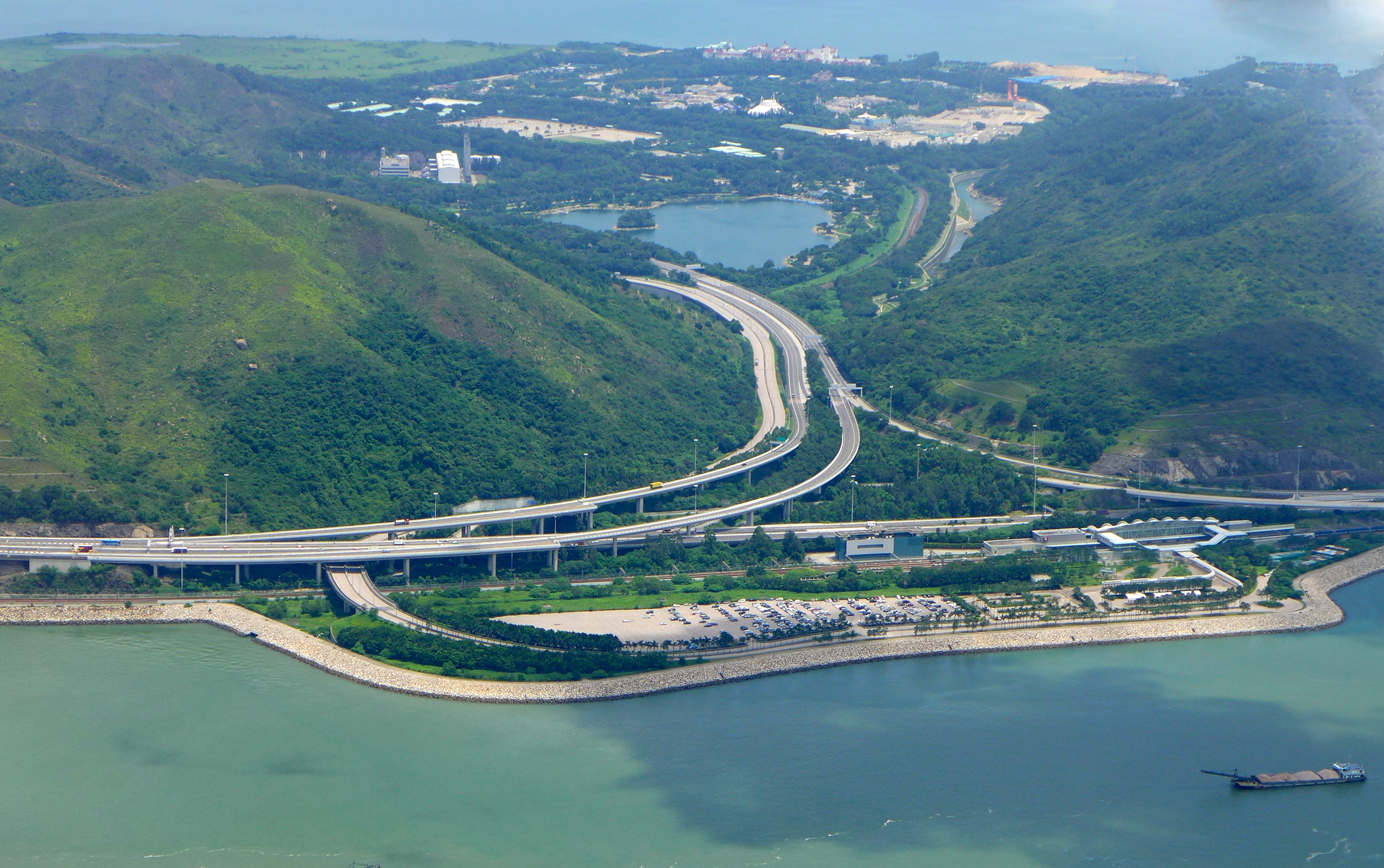
Aerial view of Sunny Bay Interchange

The North Lantau Highway is an expressway forming part of Hong Kong's Route 8 motorway, linking Hong Kong International Airport and Lantau Island with the rest of the territory. The road has three lanes in each direction for its entire length with full-width hard shoulders for emergencies and breakdowns. The speed limit is 110 kilometres per hour (68 mph) for most of its length, the highest of any road in Hong Kong.

North Lantau Highway is 12.5 kilometres (7.8 mi) in length, beginning at Airport Road on Chek Lap Kok. The road then crosses onto Lantau Island and bypasses Tung Chung New Town. The road then travels along the northern coast of Lantau Island, next to the Airport Express and Tung Chung line of the Mass Transit Railway (MTR). This section is built on reclaimed land and through various cuttings. Finally, the road climbs over Ta Shui Wan and Tsing Chau Wan to meet the Lantau Link and its bridges.

== History ==
=== Background ===
The North Lantau Highway was built as part of the Airport Core Programme in the 1990s. The ultimate aim of the new motorway was to connect Hong Kong's urban core with the new international airport (opened 1998) as well as associated new town development in Tung Chung. Construction commenced in June 1992 to a design by Mott MacDonald Hong Kong.

=== Construction and opening ===
Rather than tendering the project as a single contract, which would have drawn bids from only the largest international contractors, the Hong Kong government opted to split the expressway into three separate phases that would be more manageable in scale to local companies, thereby drawing a more competitive range of bids. The contract to construct the Tai Ho Section, worth HK$3.5 billion, was awarded on 8 June 1992 to the Lantau Expressway Joint Venture, of which Downer Group was the lead contractor. The Yam O Section contract, worth $1.328 billion, was awarded on 14 September 1992 to a joint venture comprising Aoki Corporation, Franki Contractors, and Tobishima Corporation. Lastly, the Tung Chung Section contract, worth $969.1 million, was awarded on 27 September 1993 to a joint venture composed of China State Construction Engineering, Leighton Asia and Hochtief.

The expressway opened to traffic on 22 May 1997. In the days leading up to the opening, officers of the Agriculture and Fisheries Department rounded up about 30 cattle who had wandered onto the highway during construction when the perimeter fence was not fully enclosed.

=== Sunny Bay Interchange ===
The Sunny Bay Interchange came into operation in 2005, allowing traffic to exit the North Lantau Highway onto the new Penny's Bay Highway. This opened up access to Penny's Bay, which was reclaimed mainly for the new Hong Kong Disneyland.

=== 2008 flooding ===
On 7 June 2008, North Lantau Highway and its service road, Cheung Tung Road, were completely flooded at Caribbean Coast, Tung Chung at 6 am, under rainfall as high as 145 mm (5.7 in) per hour. The highway was forced to close completely, rendering Hong Kong International Airport at Chek Lap Kok inaccessible by road. With a water depth of 3 metres (9.8 ft), and the flood extending 500 metres (550 yd) in length, some 20 vehicles were trapped on the scene by the floodwater. Another thousand vehicles were trapped in the resulting traffic jam, extending about 10 km (6.2 mi) back to the toll plaza of Lantau Link. Service was increased on the MTR Tung Chung line and Airport Express to alleviate passenger flow. The highway was partially reopened starting from 4:00 pm that day.

== Design ==
An early design for the North Lantau Highway was completed in the early 1980s. It was envisaged as a two-lane dual carriageway "[hugging] the rugged northern coastline of Lantau". However, the plan did not proceed at that time as the airport project was shelved by the government for financial reasons.

The Chek Lap Kok airport project was resurrected in 1989 under the governorship of David Wilson. In the same year, new motorways design standards were introduced in Hong Kong. In 1990, the highway was redesigned to reflect these new standards, and to take into account higher projected usage. The North Lantau Highway, as built, is a three-lane dual carriageway with a gentler grade and curvature than the earlier iteration. Hard shoulders of 3.3 metres are also provided on either side of the expressway.

Most of the highway is built on reclaimed land. The fill for the land reclamation came from slope cuttings or marine borrow areas in Hong Kong, or was river sand imported from China.

The most significant bridge along the length of the road is located at the very end of the highway, linking Lantau and Chek Lap Kok. This multi-span structure, approximately 320 metres long, also carries a utility conduit serving the airport containing electricity, water, sewerage, telephone, and raw water connections. There are smaller bridges at Tai Ho Wan and Sham Shui Kok.

== Interchanges ==
North Lantau Highway
District	Location	km	Interchange name	Exit	Destinations	Notes
Islands	Chek Lap Kok	0.0			Airport Road – Airport	Western terminus; start of Route 8 distance markers.
Islands	Tung Chung	0.4				Start of expressway; western terminus of Route 8.
Islands	Tung Chung	0.6		6C	Tung Chung Waterfront Road – Tung Chung (North)	Westbound exit and eastbound entrance Formerly numbered 6B
Islands	Tung Chung	1.6	Tung Chung Eastern Interchange	6B	Yu Tung Road – Tung Chung Town Centre, Tung Chung (West)	Westbound exit and eastbound entrance Formerly numbered 6A
Islands	Siu Ho Wan	3.4		6A	Shun Long Road – Tuen Mun, Zhuhai, Macao	Eastbound exit and westbound entrance Linkage to the Hong Kong–Zhuhai–Macau Bridge and Tuen Mun-Chek Lap Kok Link
Islands	Siu Ho Wan	4.8	Siu Ho Wan Interchange	6	Unnamed access road – Siu Ho Wan MTR Depot	
Islands	Siu Ho Wan	5.4		5A	Shun Long Road – Zhuhai, Macao	Westbound exit and eastbound entrance Linkage to the Hong Kong–Zhuhai–Macau Bridge
Tsuen Wan	Yam O	11.3	Sunny Bay Interchange	5	Penny's Bay Highway – Disneyland Resort, Sunny Bay	
Tsuen Wan	Tsing Chau Tsai	12.9	Lantau Toll Plaza		Lantau Link – Tsing Yi, Kowloon, Hong Kong	Eastern terminus (at toll booths); Route 8 continues
1.000 mi = 1.609 km; 1.000 km = 0.621 mi: Incomplete access

== Traffic ==
The Transport Department offers traffic figures at two sections of the North Lantau Highway. The section between the western end of the highway (i.e. Airport Road) and the Tung Chung Eastern Interchange registered annual average daily traffic (AADT) of 54,410 in 2016. The section between Tung Chung and Ngong Shuen Au was busier, carrying 66,110 AADT in 2016.

Traffic on the highway has increased in recent years. Some residents and legislators have raised concerns that the new Hong Kong–Zhuhai–Macau Bridge (see below) will increase traffic congestion.

== Current developments ==
A new interchange at Tai Ho Wan is under construction. This will connect the North Lantau Expressway to the Border Crossing Facilities Island (BCF Island), a new artificial island being built for the controversial Hong Kong–Zhuhai–Macau Bridge project. The connection between the new island and the North Lantau Expressway is actually being built under the Tuen Mun–Chek Lap Kok Link project, a new road tunnel connecting Tuen Mun to the BCF Island.

From the new interchange, a two-lane dual carriageway will run on viaducts, over the sea, to the BCF Island. The project (including the viaducts, the interchange, and modifications to the North Lantau Highway and Cheung Tung Road) is being built by Hong Kong contractor Gammon Construction for a contract value of HK$8.66 billion. The Highways Departments expects this to be complete by 2019.

Preceded by Lantau Link	Hong Kong Route 8 North Lantau Highway	Succeeded by Western Terminus
