= Penny's Bay Highway =

Highway in Lantau, Hong Kong

Coordinates: 22.325663°N 114.035357°E

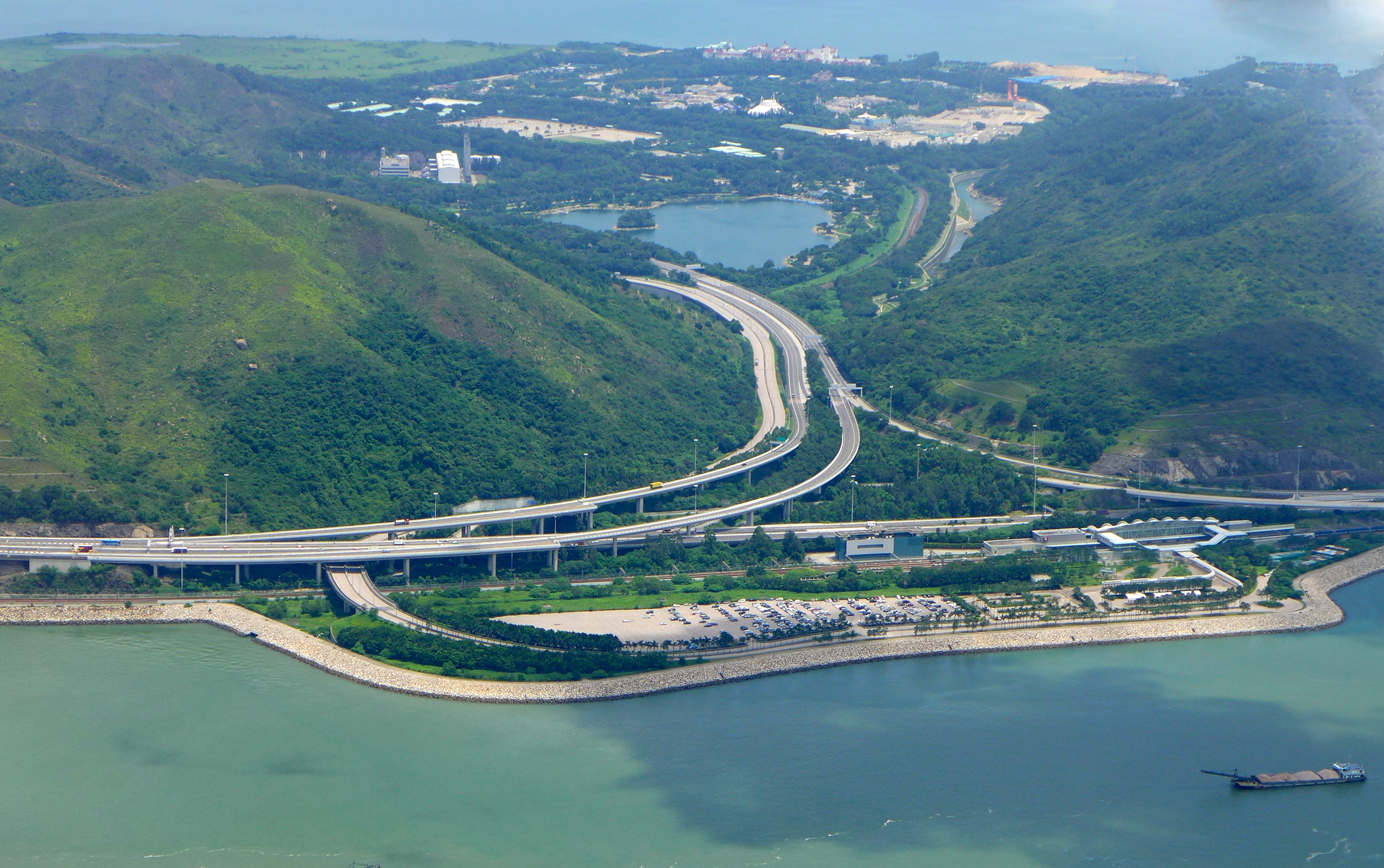

Route information
- Length: 1.5 km (0.93 mi)
- Existed: 2005–present

Major junctions
- East end: Magic Road / Sunny Bay Road at Penny's Bay
- West end: Route 8 at Yam O (Sunny Bay)

Location
- Country: China
- Special administrative region: Hong Kong

Highway system
- Transport in Hong Kong; Routes; Roads and Streets

Penny's Bay Highway (Chinese: 竹篙灣公路; Jyutping: zuk1 gou1 waan1 gung1 lou6) is a section of expressway on Lantau Island in Hong Kong. The road links North Lantau Highway to Hong Kong Disneyland Resort and Penny's Bay Quarantine Centre in Penny's Bay. It is approximately 1.5 km, starting from the North Lantau Highway's junction in Yam O and ending at Penny's Bay to link with Magic Road (to Hong Kong Disneyland Resort) and Sunny Bay Road (to Yam O).

The road was opened in 2005 to connect Hong Kong Disneyland, which opened in the same year, to the rest of Hong Kong via the Hong Kong Strategic Route and Exit Number System. From the north terminus at North Lantau Highway, it passes parallel to Sunny Bay Road through a valley before reaching its southern terminus, a roundabout intersecting with Sunny Bay Road and Magic Road.

== Major intersections ==
The entire route is in Tsuen Wan District.

Location	km	mi	Destinations	Notes
Penny's Bay	0.0	0.0	Sunny Bay Road / Magic Road – Disneyland	Eastern terminus
Yam O	1.5	0.93	Route 8 west (North Lantau Highway) – Tung Chung, Hong Kong International Airport	Western terminus
Yam O	1.5	0.93	Route 8 east (Lantau Link) – Tsing Yi, Tsuen Wan, Kowloon	Western terminus
1.000 mi = 1.609 km; 1.000 km = 0.621 mi

== See also ==
- List of expressways in Hong Kong

Other expressways and major road infrastructure on Lantau Island include:

- North Lantau Highway
- Lantau Link
- Route 8 (Hong Kong)
