= Stonecutters Bridge =

Bridge in Hong Kong

Stonecutters Bridge 昂船洲大橋
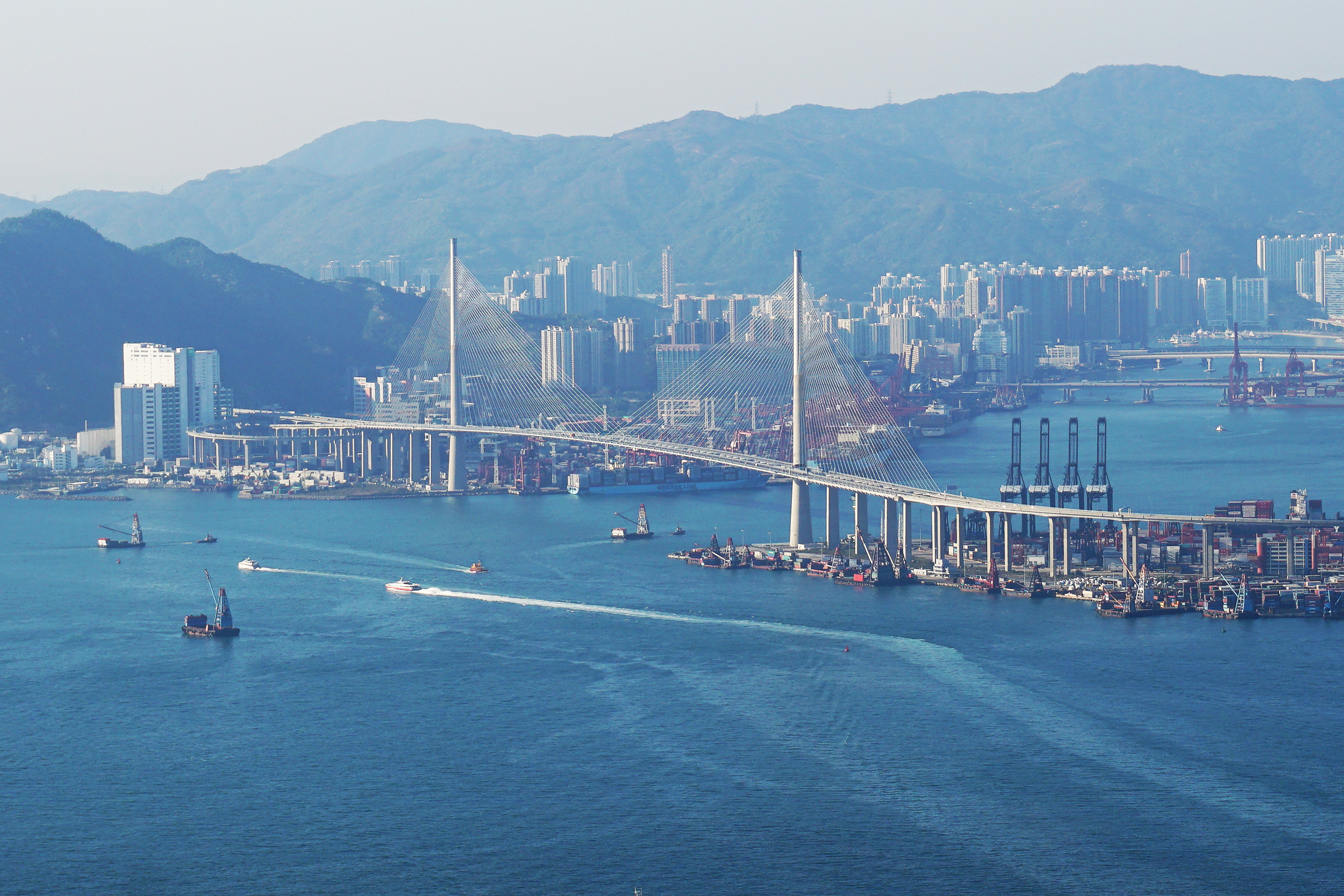
- Bird's-eye view
- Coordinates: 22°19′34″N 114°07′06″E
- Carries: Motor vehicles
- Crosses: Rambler Channel
- Locale: New Territories, Hong Kong

Characteristics
- Design: Cable-stayed
- Total length: 1,596 m (5,236 ft)
- Width: 53.3 m (175 ft)
- Height: 293.5 m (963 ft)
- Longest span: 1,018 m (3,340 ft)
- Clearance below: 73.5 m (241 ft)

History
- Designer: Dissing+Weitling
- Engineering design by: Ove Arup & Partners
- Construction start: 27 April 2004; 21 years ago
- Construction end: 29 July 2009; 16 years ago
- Opened: 20 December 2009; 16 years ago

Location
- Interactive map of Stonecutters Bridge

Stonecutters Bridge
- Traditional Chinese: 昂船洲大橋
- Simplified Chinese: 昂船洲大桥
Transcriptions
Standard Mandarin
- Hanyu Pinyin: áng chuán zhōu dà qiáo
Yue: Cantonese
- Yale Romanization: ngong5 syun4 jau1 daai6 kiu4

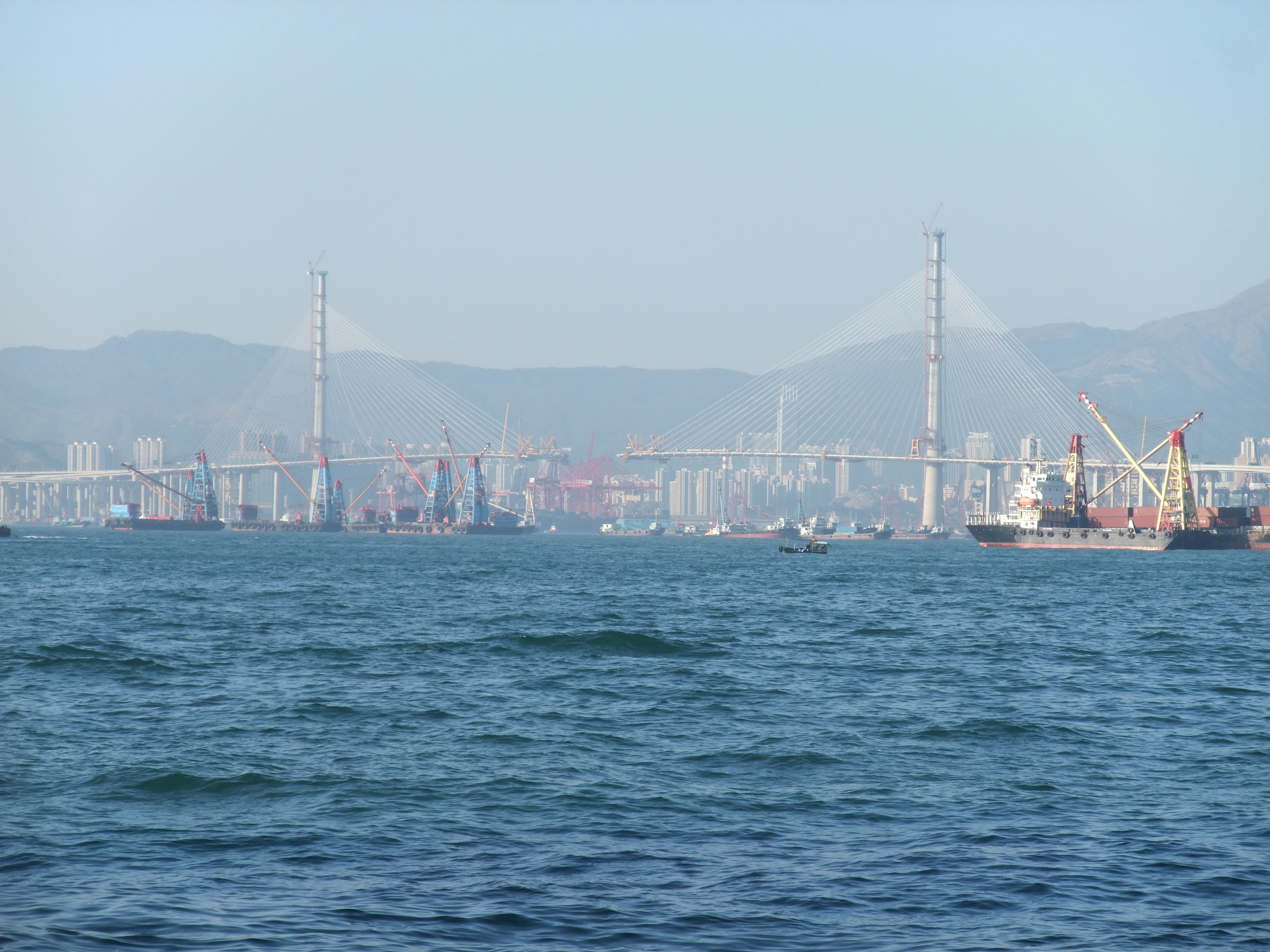
Stonecutters Bridge under construction, 2008

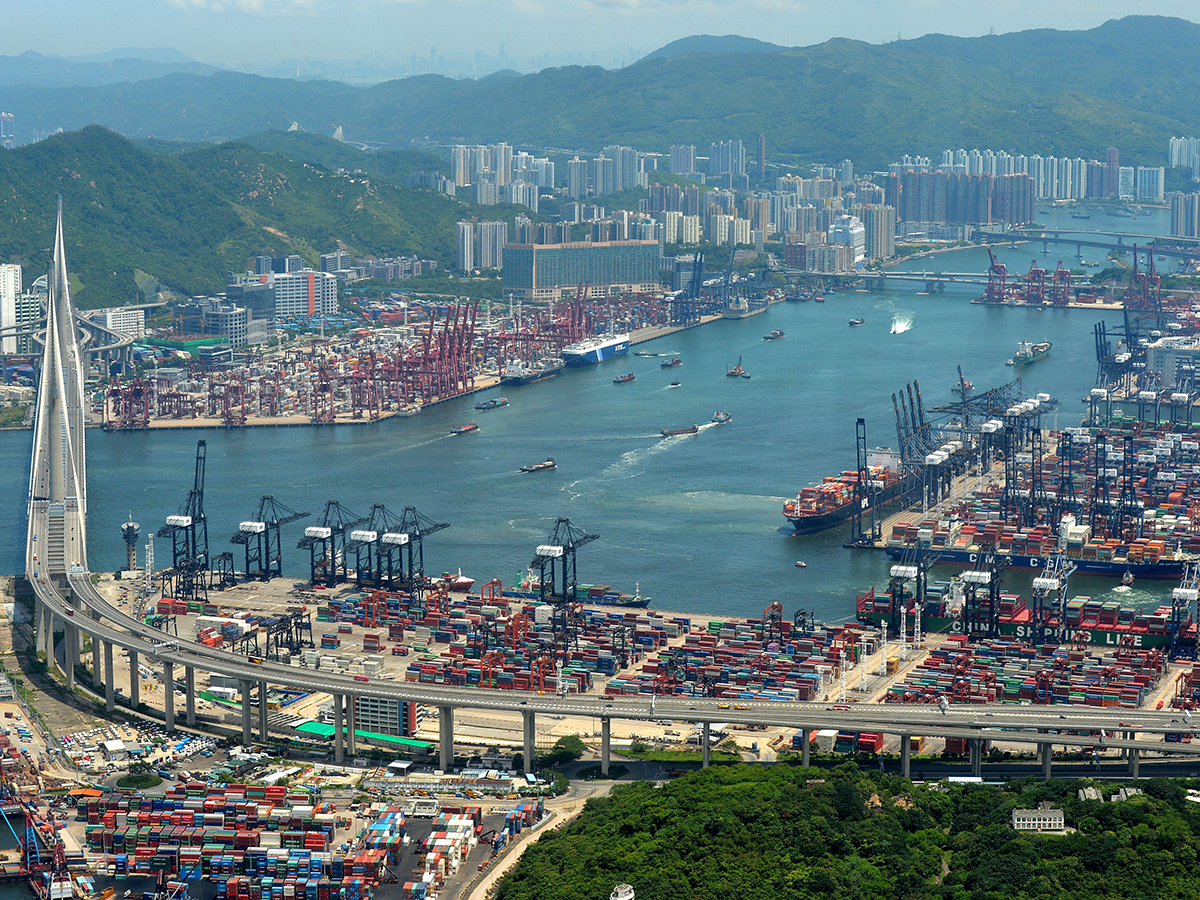
Stonecutters Bridge crossing Port of Hong Kong container terminal in Kwai Chung.

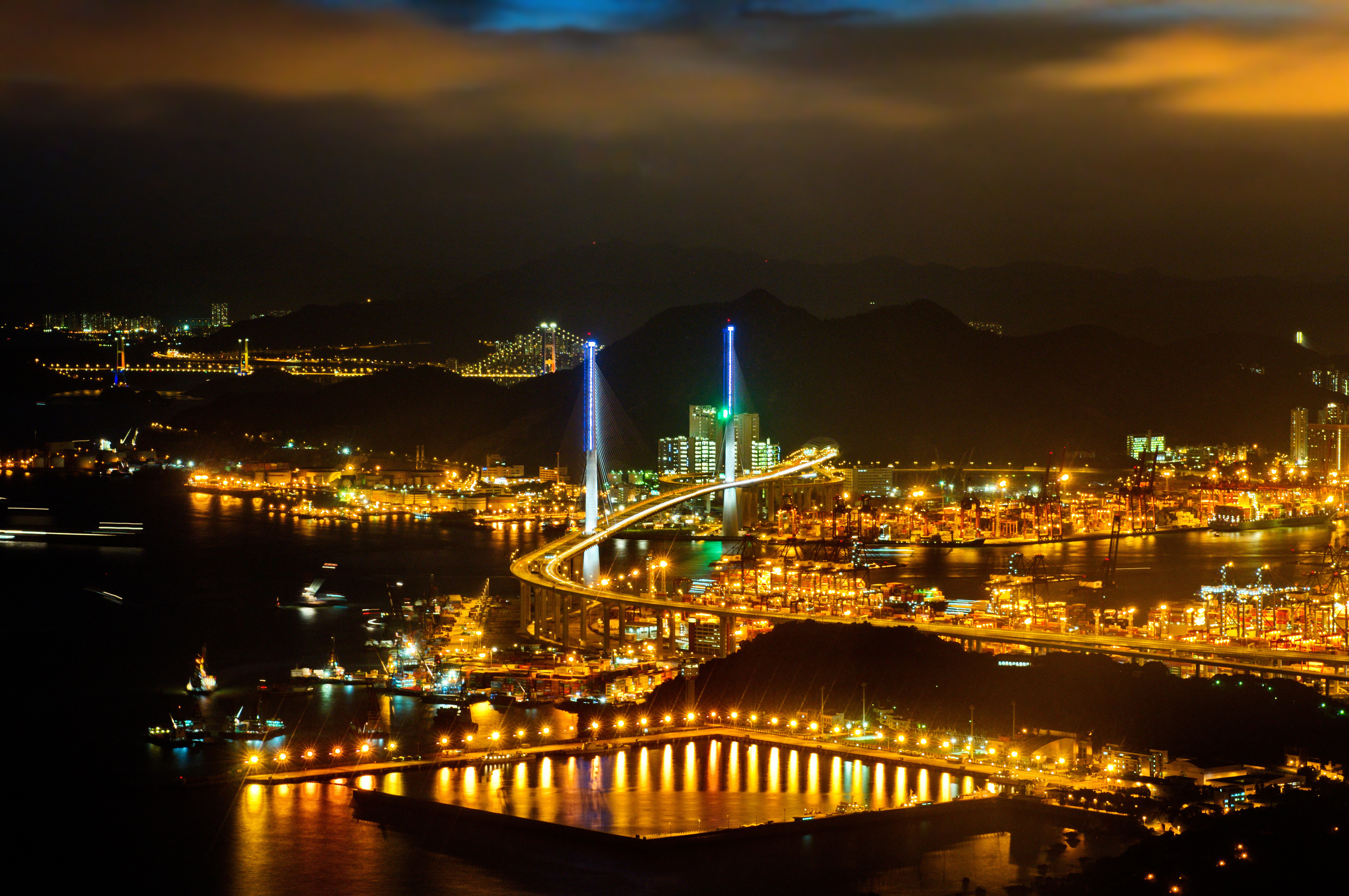
Stonecutters Bridge at night, view from Sky-100

Stonecutters Bridge is a high level cable-stayed bridge spanning the Rambler Channel in Hong Kong, connecting Nam Wan Kok, Tsing Yi to Stonecutters Island. The bridge deck was completed on 7 April 2009, and opened to traffic on 20 December that year. The bridge was the second-longest cable-stayed span in the world at the time of its completion.

The approaches at Tsing Yi and Stonecutters Island are located near Container Terminal 9 and Container Terminal 8, respectively.

The bridge is part of Hong Kong's Route 8, connecting Sha Tin, Cheung Sha Wan, Tsing Yi island, Ma Wan and Lantau Island. Other major constructions along the route are Nam Wan Tunnel (completed in 2008), Eagle's Nest Tunnel (completed in 2008), Sha Tin Heights Tunnel (completed in 2008), Tsing Ma Bridge (completed in 1997) and Kap Shui Mun Bridge (completed in 1997).

== Honors ==
Upon its completion, Stonecutters Bridge won the 2009 Tanaka Award sponsored by the Japan Society of Civil Engineers.

The Stonecutters Bridge won the 2010 Supreme Award at the annual Structural Awards presented by the Institution of Structural Engineers, United Kingdom.

== History ==
Construction commenced on 27 April 2004 by Maeda-Hitachi-Yokogawa-Hsin Chong JV (a joint venture of Maeda Corporation, Hitachi Zosen Corporation, Yokogawa Bridge Corporation, and Hsin Chong). It cost HK$2.76 billion. It was reported to be over budget.

== Structure ==
The bridge spans 1.6 km (0.99 mi), with 3 lanes in each direction. It is a cable-stayed bridge with two bridge towers, one on Tsing Yi Island and the other on Stonecutters Island.

With a main span of 1,018 m (3,340 ft), Stonecutters Bridge has the third-longest cable-stayed span in the world, after the Sutong Bridge and Bridge to Russky Island.

It was built at a cost of HK$2.76 billion.

== Bridge design ==
The design concept for the bridge was procured by Highways Department in Hong Kong through an international design competition. The winning scheme was the one presented by a group consisting of bridge architect Dissing+Weitling together with engineering firms Halcrow Group, Flint & Neill and Shanghai Municipal Engineering Design Institute. The design was selected as the Reference Scheme for the further design development. A group led by Arup with COWI A/S as main sub-consultant has carried out the further design development of the Reference Scheme and the detailed design that followed.

The concept was for a cable-stayed bridge with a twin aerodynamic deck suspended from two 295m-high single pole towers. These towers have bases measuring 24m x 18m tapering to 7m diameter at the top, and the deck allows a navigation clearance of 73.5m over the full entrance to the Container Port.

The two towers are in concrete until level +175m and in composite construction consisting of an inner concrete ring with a stainless steel skin for the top 120m. The original concept had a conventional steel structure above level +175m but Arup found that this configuration would be too lively and lead to unacceptable vibrations of the stay cables. Using a heavier composite section instead of a pure steel structure solved this problem. For reasons of durability and to enhance the appearance, further studies concluded that the tower skin should be fabricated from a duplex stainless steel (grade 1.4462 to BSEN10088) with a shot peened surface finish. The deck itself is made of steel in the main span and of concrete in the side spans.

The tower foundations are located within 10m of the seawall on either side of the Rambler Channel, close to the back-up land next to CT8 and CT9. Their proximity to the channel necessitated ship impact testing and modelling. Geotechnical centrifuge testing was conducted using a 1:200 scale model of a vessel bow section and seawall within a container.

== Wind studies ==
The Hong Kong region is susceptible to very strong typhoon winds, a fact that was taken into account in the design of the bridge. In October 2002 a 50 m (160 ft) mast was erected at the site to measure the speed, direction and turbulence of winds in the area. Readings, which continued until January 2004, were transmitted in real-time to an offsite location for further analysis. In particular, the stability of the 509 m (1,670 ft) long cantilevers during construction required special consideration in the design.

== Walk For Millions ==
Prior to its formal commissioning, a Community Chest Walk for Millions was held 15 November 2009 to allow the public to walk along Stonecutters Bridge and East Tsing Yi Viaduct and through Nam Wan Tunnel. Over 30,000 participants took part, raising more than HK$10 million for the charity's Children and Youth Services.

== In popular media ==
As a result of the interesting challenges and extreme difficulty in constructing this bridge, the project was featured on two of the Discovery Channel's Extreme Engineering series on 1 November 2006 and 27 April 2009.

== See also ==
- Transport in Hong Kong
- Tunnels and bridges in Hong Kong
- List of bridges in China
