= Tsing Ma Bridge =

Suspension bridge in Hong Kong

Tsing Ma Bridge 青馬大橋
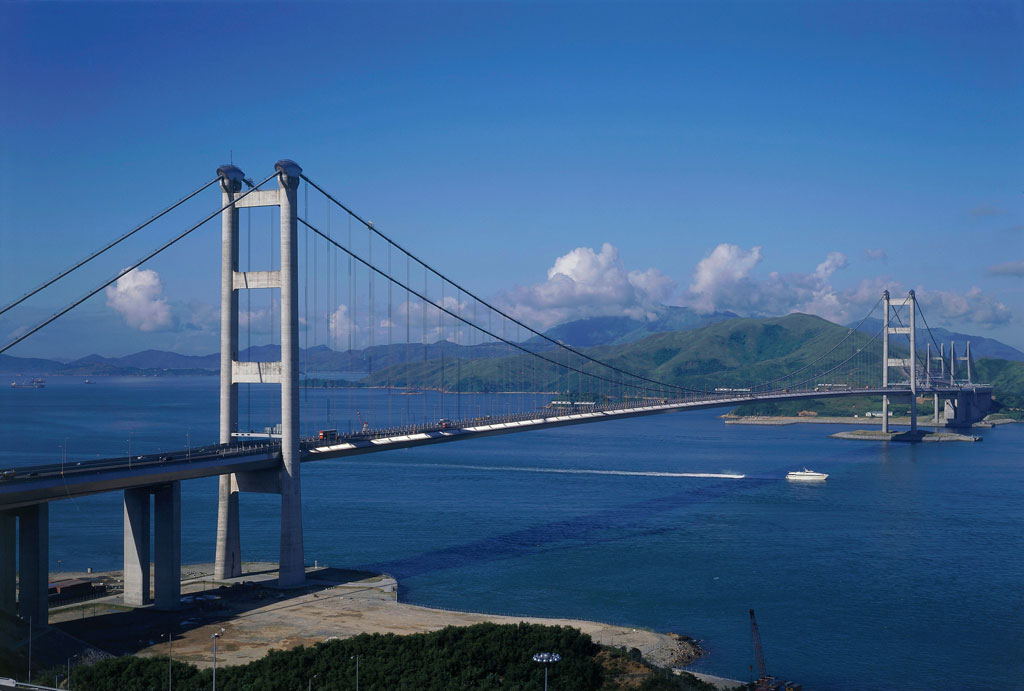
- View from Tsing Yi
- Coordinates: 22°21′05″N 114°04′27″E
- Carries: Trains, motor vehicles
- Crosses: Ma Wan Channel
- Locale: New Territories, Hong Kong
- Owner: Hong Kong Government
- Maintained by: TIML MOM Limited (under contract to Highways Department)

Characteristics
- Design: Double-decked suspension bridge
- Width: 41 metres (135 ft)
- Longest span: 1,377 metres (4,518 ft)
- Clearance below: 53 metres (174 ft) (official shipping height restriction)
- No. of lanes: 6 (upper deck), 2 (lower deck)

Rail characteristics
- No. of tracks: 2
- Track gauge: 1,432 mm (4 ft 8 3/8 in)
- Electrified: 1.5 kV DC

History
- Designer: Mott MacDonald
- Constructed by: Anglo Japanese Construction Joint Venture
- Fabrication by: Cleveland Bridge & Engineering Company
- Construction start: May 1992; 34 years ago
- Construction end: May 1997; 29 years ago
- Construction cost: HK$7.14 billion
- Opened: 22 May 1997; 29 years ago
- Inaugurated: 27 April 1997; 29 years ago

Statistics
- Daily traffic: 87,764 (2016) (Lantau Link)
- Toll: No (Since 27 December 2020)

Location
- Interactive map of Tsing Ma Bridge

Tsing Ma Bridge
- Traditional Chinese: 青馬大橋
- Simplified Chinese: 青马大桥
- Literal meaning: Tsing Yi-Ma Wan Great Bridge
Transcriptions
Standard Mandarin
- Hanyu Pinyin: Qīngmǎ Dàqiáo
Hakka
- Romanization: Ciang1 ma1 tai4 kiau2
Yue: Cantonese
- Yale Romanization: Ching1 ma5 daai6 kiu4
- Jyutping: Cing1 maa5 daai6 kiu4

Tsing Ma Bridge is a bridge in Hong Kong that connects Tsing Yi and Ma Wan islands. It is the world's 21st-longest span suspension bridge, and was the second longest at the time of its completion. The bridge was named after the two islands it connects, namely Tsing Yi and Ma Wan. It has two decks and carries both road and rail traffic, which also makes it the largest suspension bridge of this type. The bridge has a main span of 1,377 metres (4,518 ft) and a height of 206 metres (676 ft). The span is currently the longest of all bridges in the world carrying rail traffic.

The 41-metre-wide (135 ft) bridge deck carries six lanes of automobile traffic, with three lanes in each direction. The lower level contains two rail tracks and two sheltered carriageways used for maintenance access and traffic lanes when particularly severe typhoons strike Hong Kong and the bridge deck is closed to traffic.

== History ==
=== Background ===
The Tsing Ma Bridge is the most prominent element of the Lantau Link, an infrastructure project built to connect Lantau, Hong Kong's largest island, to the urbanised areas of the territory. Until this link opened in 1997, Lantau Island could only be accessed by water, and was completely rural. The Lantau Link was built as part of the Airport Core Programme, which ultimately served to provide Hong Kong with a brand new airport at Chek Lap Kok (off the north coast of Lantau) to replace the older, congested Kai Tak Airport.

=== Construction ===
Numerous consortia bid on the contract to construct the bridge. Hyundai made the lowest bid but were disqualified for non-compliance with the financial requirements. A Japanese bid was ruled out for being too expensive. The Anglo Japanese Construction Joint Venture, comprising Costain, Mitsui, and Trafalgar House, won the job. Construction work on the bridge began in May 1992. Gammon Construction constructed the caissons for the bridge towers. The framework for each caisson was floated into place and sunk, and then filled with concrete underwater. The two caissons on the Ma Wan side weigh 4,500 tons each, while those on the Tsing Yi side (closer to shore) each weigh about 3,000 tons. Land reclamation was carried out at both ends of the bridge. The more substantial reclamation on Ma Wan was used as a work platform for construction crews.

The first steel deck segment was lifted into place in late 1994. The approach deck segments were constructed in Britain and Dubai and then shipped to Hong Kong for assembling. The main span segments were built by Cleveland Bridge & Engineering Company in the U.K. and by Mitsui in Japan. The climbing cranes used to erect the tower portals were coincidentally also used on the HSBC Main Building a decade earlier, as well as at Canary Wharf in the interim.

=== Inauguration ===
Construction was finished in May 1997. It cost HK$7.2 billion. The Lantau Link, of which the bridge is an integral part, was inaugurated on 27 April 1997 by former British Prime Minister Margaret Thatcher. Security was extremely tight as Thatcher was considered one of the top targets of the Irish Republican Army.

The commemoration ceremony began with a flotilla of police and other government vessels passing beneath the bridge, before Government Flying Service and Royal Air Force aircraft flew above the concrete towers. Thatcher, Chief Secretary Anson Chan, and Governor Chris Patten then switched on the bridge lights and drove across the span with other dignitaries. The celebration concluded with a 20-minute firework and laser show, featuring fire pouring from the length of the bridge, engineered by the Pyromagic Productions company. Chief Executive-designate Tung Chee-hwa declined to attend as he said he would rather meet with officials in Guangdong.

The opening ceremony was highly anticipated and attracted more than 100,000 spectators, most of them standing along Castle Peak Road, which was closed to road traffic. The Tuen Mun Road was also closed to traffic from 7:40 to 8:20 pm, and a 20-minute fireworks display, costing HK$5 million, began at 8 pm. MTR, Citybus, and KCR Corporation arranged special transport services for the event. More than 2,300 police officers were deployed, and the crowd control exercise was studied by the police for its relevance to the upcoming Handover ceremony. Three boating accidents occurred during the bridge inauguration.

The Lantau Link was opened to traffic on 22 May 1997 at 8:00 am. Cars queued for four hours before police opened the bridge. Snaking queues also formed at bus stations at 7:00 am as passengers sought to view the new infrastructure as well as the North Lantau New Town, which was still under construction.

The first road accident on the Lantau Link occurred on the Tsing Ma Bridge on 23 May 1997. Two motorcyclists were injured in a collision with a lorry. The police warned the public not to rush to use the new bridges and highways to avoid causing chaos.

Two special bus routes came into operation on 24 May 1997 for passengers to view the Lantau Link. The X21 and X31 buses ran from Tai Kok Tsui and Tsuen Wan, respectively.

== Operation ==
The Tsing Ma Bridge crosses the Ma Wan Channel, linking the islands of Tsing Yi and Ma Wan. It is part of the Lantau Link, which links the New Territories and Lantau Island, and eventually leads to the Hong Kong International Airport on Chek Lap Kok via the North Lantau Highway.

The Tsing Ma Bridge is an important gateway to Lantau Island. It is part of the Route 8 expressway, which connects the Lantau Link, the West Kowloon expressway, Cheung Sha Wan and Sha Tin. The rail line is shared by the MTR's Tung Chung line and Airport Express.

The bridge, together with other highway, bridge and tunnel connections in the area, are part of the Tsing Ma Control Area under the Tsing Ma Control Area Ordinance (Cap. 498) in Hong Kong Law. The control area has been managed by Tsing Ma Management Limited since opening. The control area's traffic management system was developed by Delcan Corporation of Toronto, Ontario, Canada. Special regulations and by-laws apply in the area.

Along with the Ting Kau Bridge and Kap Shui Mun Bridge, the bridge is monitored by the Wind and Structural Health Monitoring System (WASHMS). Surveillance cameras are also installed on the bridge to record traffic conditions. The video is available at the government website. It is updated every two minutes.

There are no longer tolls on Lantau Link since 27 December 2020. Before, the fee of using Tsing Ma bridge for motorcycles, private cars, public double-decker buses and heavy goods vehicles are HK$10, $15, $30 and $40 respectively, charged both directions. The normal speed limit on the bridge is 80 kilometres per hour (50 mph), subject to lowering in the event of road work or strong wind. Traffic may also be directed to the sheltered carriageways on the lower deck when there are very strong winds. There are no pavements on the bridge.

== Design ==
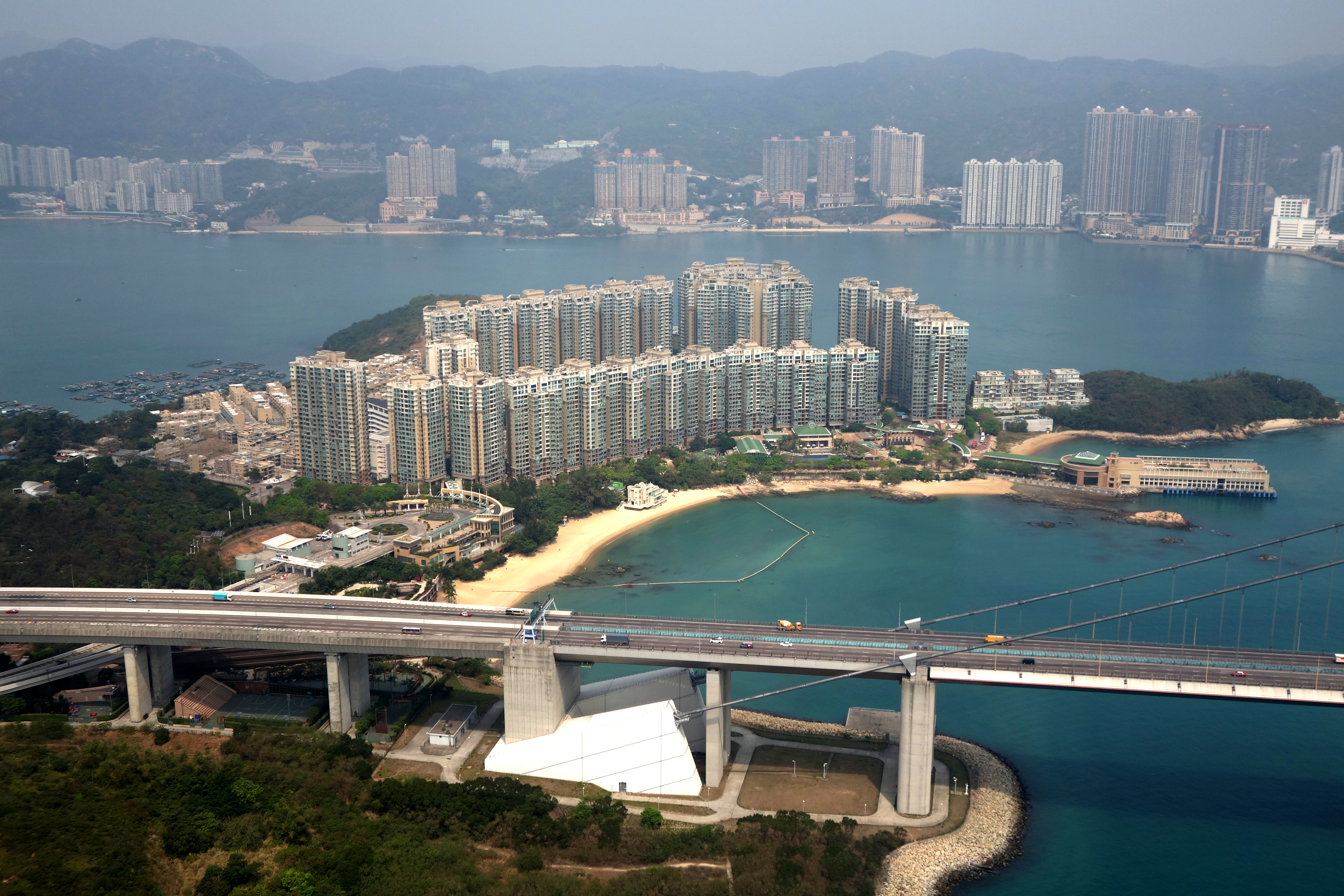
Ma Wan abutment

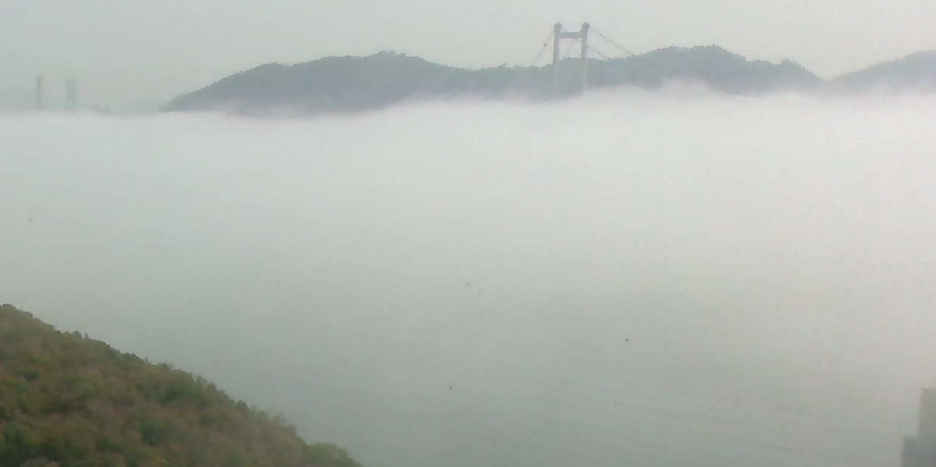
Tsing Ma bridge viewed from Ma Wan under dense fog

The bridge was designed by Mott MacDonald. The firm designed an early iteration of the bridge in 1982, with a two lane dual carriageway on the top deck, and a light railway on the lower deck. The bridge was redesigned beginning in 1989 to account for the three lane dual highway and the heavier airport railway. The designers were inspired by the Forth Bridge in Scotland and the Severn Bridge in England.

=== Wind tunnel testing ===
The objectives of the wind tunnel studies were to demonstrate the safety of the structure under construction and once completed, both with respect to aerodynamic stability as well as the possible effects of extreme typhoon wind speeds. A further objective was to provide dynamic response data at several key locations to compare with full scale data from the ongoing monitoring program, conducted by the Highways Department of Hong Kong.

A 1 to 80 scale section model of the deck in the erection stage, and a 1 to 400 scale full aeroelastic model of the entire bridge were constructed. It is a Monte-Carlo simulation of the typhoon wind climate. The full model was tested in different stages of construction in turbulent boundary layer flow, complete with the local topography to model the wind conditions at the site. The model tests identified critical stages of erection that allowed the construction schedule of the bridge to be tailored to avoid the typhoon season. The comparison of model test results and the full scale monitoring will assist engineers to better understand the behaviour of long span bridges in wind and to improve current design methods.

=== Major components ===
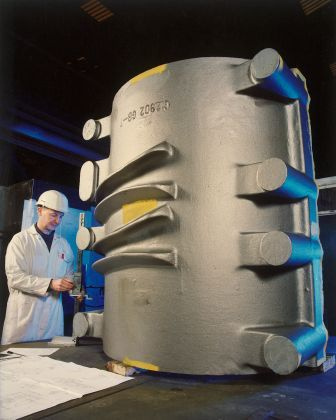
Cable band for Tsing Ma Bridge undergoing dimensional inspection

There is one tower located on Wok Tai Wan of Tsing Yi side and another on a man-made island 120 metres (390 ft) off the coast of Ma Wan. Both towers are 206 metres (676 ft) above sea level and founded on relatively shallow bedrock. The towers are two-legged with trusses at intervals, in the form of portal beam design. The legs were constructed with high-strength concrete of 50 MPa (concrete grade 50/20) strength, using a slipform system in a continuous operation.

The pulling force in the main suspension cables is taken up by large gravity anchorages located at both ends of the bridge. They are massive concrete structures deeply seated on bedrock on the landside of Tsing Yi and Ma Wan island. The total weight of concrete used in the Tsing Yi anchorage is 200,000 tonnes, and Ma Wan Anchorage has 250,000 tonnes of concrete.

The cables were constructed by an aerial spinning process. The process involved drawing wires from a constant-tension supply, and pulling loops of these wires from one anchorage to the other, passing through a 500-tonne cast-iron saddle on top of each bridge tower seating the cable. A total of 70,000 galvanised wires of 5.38-millimetre (0.212 in) diameter were placed and adjusted to form the two 1.1-metre (3.6 ft) diameter main cables.

The steelwork for the deck structure was fabricated in Britain and Japan. After delivery, they were further processed and assembled in Dongguan, China into standard deck modules. A total of 96 modules, each 18 metres (59 ft) long and about 480 tonnes in weight, were prepared. These deck modules were brought to the site by specially designed barges and raised into the deck position by a pair of strand jack gantries that could manoeuvre along the main cable.

The approach span on the Tsing Yi side is similar in form and cross-section to the suspended deck, but is supported on piers instead by cables. The first span was assembled on the ground and raised into position using strand jacks. Further construction then proceeded in cantilever in smaller sections, using derrick cranes stationed on the deck level. An expansion joint which allowed for a maximum thermal movement of ± 835 millimetres (32.9 in) was also provided and located inside the approach span.

The bridge parapets are of a special design by Hong Kong standards, comprising high-tension steel strands anchored on metal posts.

=== Ship impact protection ===
The rock seawalls around the base of each bridge tower are capable of halting a 220,000 tonne ship moving at eight knots.

== Tourism ==
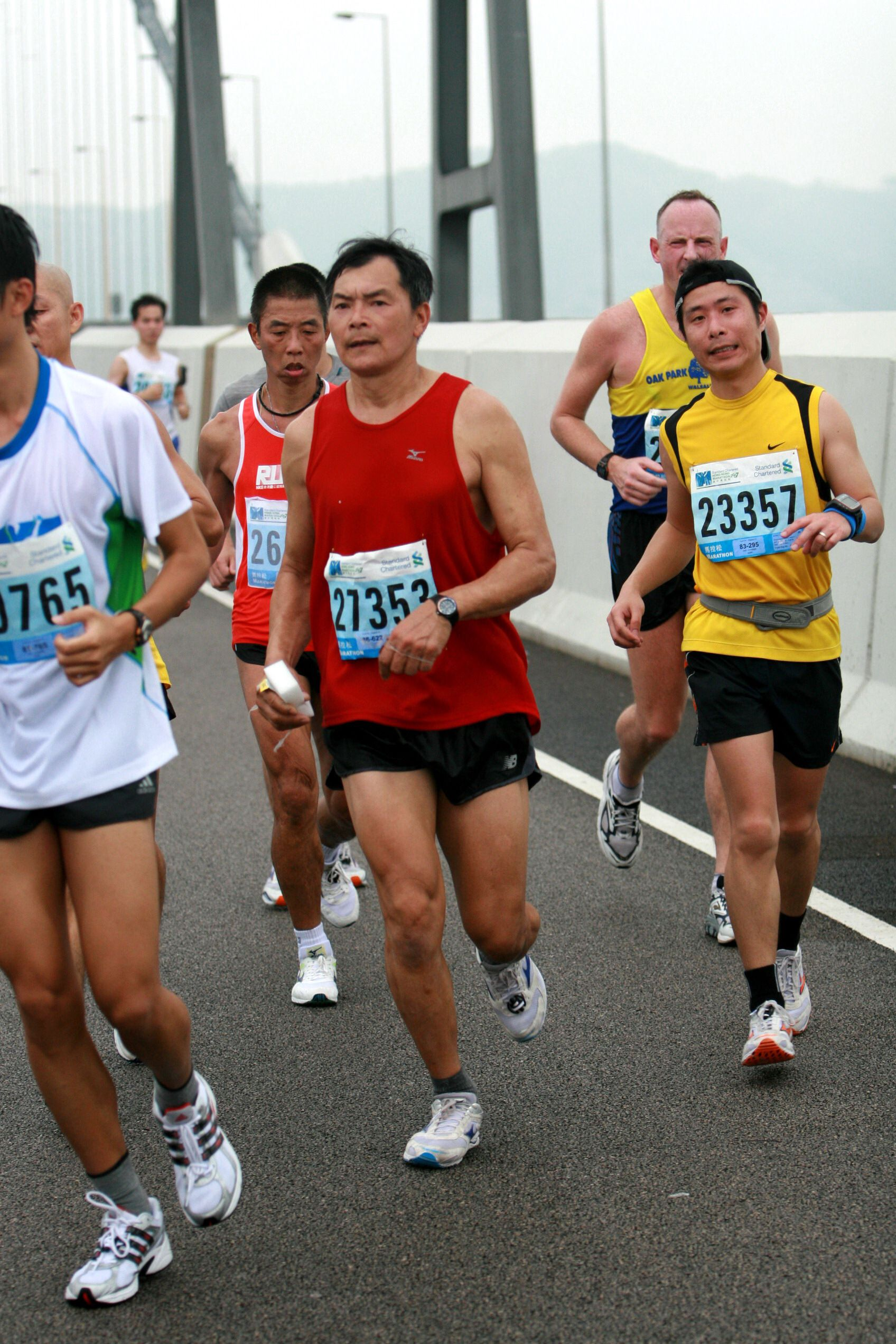
The Hong Kong Marathon utilised the bridge until 2016. Because of complaints over traffic, organisers were forced to remove the bridge from the marathon course.

The Tsing Ma Bridge has become a scenic spot as well as a landmark. There is a visitor centre, the Lantau Link Visitors Centre and Viewing Platform, located at the northwest corner of Tsing Yi Island, near the bridge's Tsing Yi end. From the Scenery Viewing Platform, one can also see the Ting Kau Bridge and Kap Shui Mun Bridge. The bridge can also be seen from the Airport Core Programme Exhibition Centre located about 2 kilometres (1.2 mi) north of the bridge.

You can also get a great view of the bridge at several points during the Tsing Yi Nature Trails hike, which can be easily accessed by several buses.

== See also ==
- List of bridges in China
- List of longest suspension bridge spans
- List of tunnels and bridges in Hong Kong
- List of road–rail bridges

Preceded by Nam Wan Tunnel	Hong Kong Route 8 Tsing Ma Bridge	Succeeded by Ma Wan Viaduct
