= Tai Po Road =

Road in Hong Kong

Coordinates: 22.38893°N 114.19353°E

- 大埔公路

Route information
- Length: 21.9 km (13.6 mi): 1.6 km (0.99 mi) Tai Wo section; 1.1 km (0.68 mi) Yuen Chau Tsai section; 3.6 km (2.2 mi) Tai Po Kau section; 2.8 km (1.7 mi) Ma Liu Shui section; 4.0 km (2.5 mi) Sha Tin section; 1.2 km (0.75 mi) Tai Wai section; 3.3 km (2.1 mi) Sha Tin Heights section; 1.2 km (0.75 mi) Piper's Hill section; 3.1 km (1.9 mi) Section in Kowloon
- Existed: 1902–present

Major junctions
- South end: Cheung Sha Wan Road at Mong Kok
- Castle Peak Road at Sham Shui Po; Route 7 at Lai Chi Kok; Route 8 at Tai Wai; Route 9 from Sha Tin to Ma Liu Shui; Route 1 at Fo Tan; Route 9 at Island House
- North end: Kwong Fuk Road/Nam Wan Road at Tai Po South

Location
- Country: China
- Special administrative region: Hong Kong

Highway system
- Transport in Hong Kong; Routes; Roads and Streets

Tai Po Road (Kowloon portion)
- Chinese: 大埔道
Transcriptions
Standard Mandarin
- Hanyu Pinyin: Dàbù Dào
Yue: Cantonese
- Yale Romanization: daai6 bou3 dou6

Tai Po Road (New Territories portion)
- Chinese: 大埔公路
Transcriptions
Standard Mandarin
- Hanyu Pinyin: Dàbù Gōnglù
Yue: Cantonese
- Yale Romanization: daai6 bou3 gung1 lou6

Tai Po Road (Chinese: 大埔公路; Jyutping: daai6 bou3 gung1 lou6) is the second longest road in Hong Kong (after Castle Peak Road). It spans from Sham Shui Po in Kowloon to Tai Po in the New Territories of Hong Kong. Initially, the road was named Frontier Road.

== Location ==
The road begins at Cheung Sha Wan Road near Boundary Street and Nathan Road at Sham Shui Po, runs through the valley between Golden Hill and Beacon Hill, and merges into the Tsing Sha Highway in Sha Tin and then the New Territories Circular Road. It then continues northward along Sha Tin Hoi and Tai Po Hoi. It ends at the Tai Po River near Tai Po Market station.

== History ==
Built in 1902, Tai Po Road is one of the earliest major roads in the New Territories. Until the completion of the Lion Rock Tunnel in 1967, Tai Po Road was the main road connecting the New Territories with Kowloon. Before the construction of the Fanling Highway in the 1980s, the road connected Fanling and Sheung Shui.

On 10 February 2018, at approximately 18:13 HKT, a Kowloon Motor Bus (KMB) double-decker bus flipped onto its side on Tai Po Road. The crash killed 19 people and injured 65. The incident was Hong Kong's second deadliest road traffic accident, behind a 2003 incident on Tuen Mun Road that killed 21.

== Gallery ==
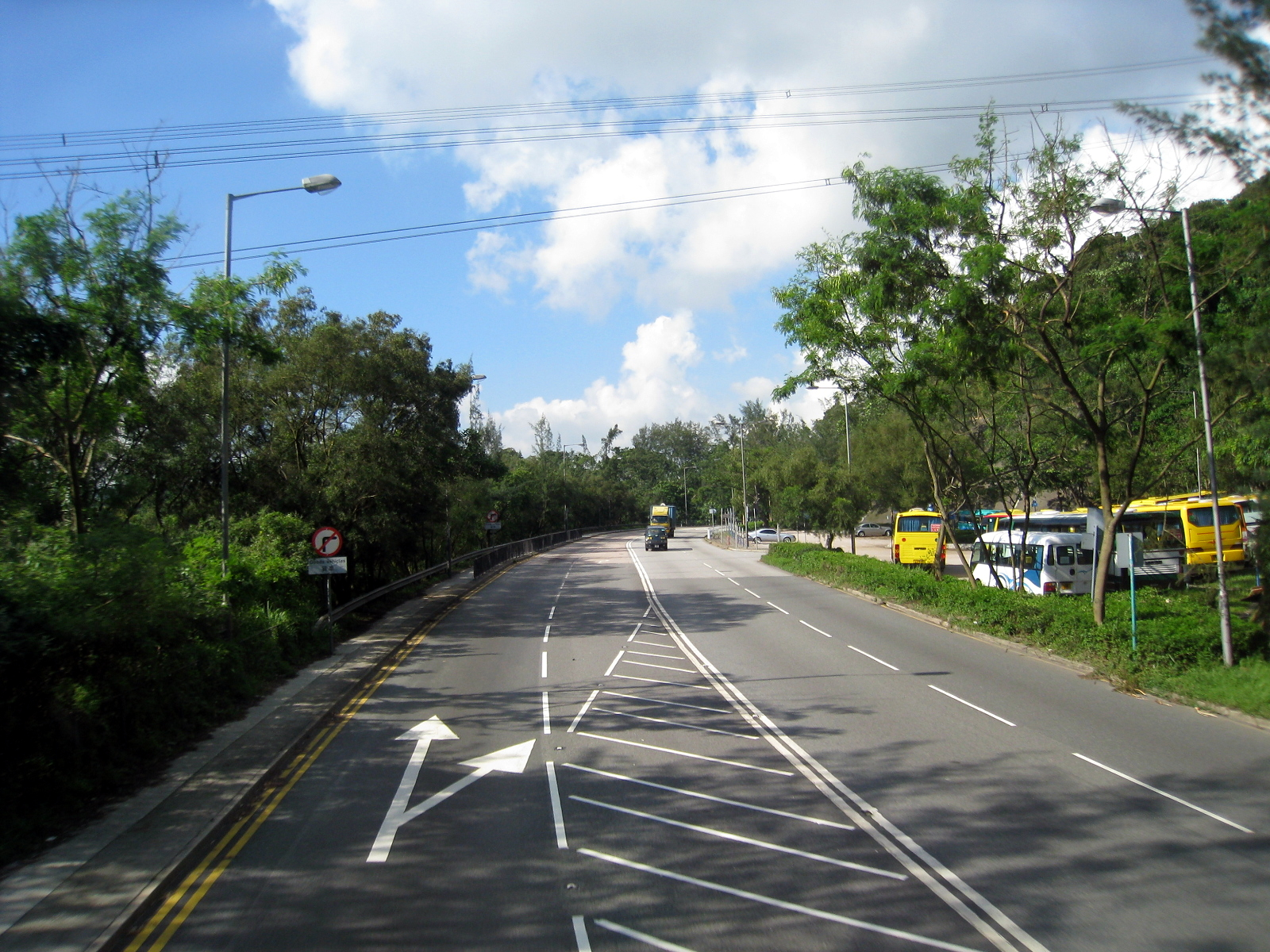
Tai Po Road Piper's Hill Section in June 2008

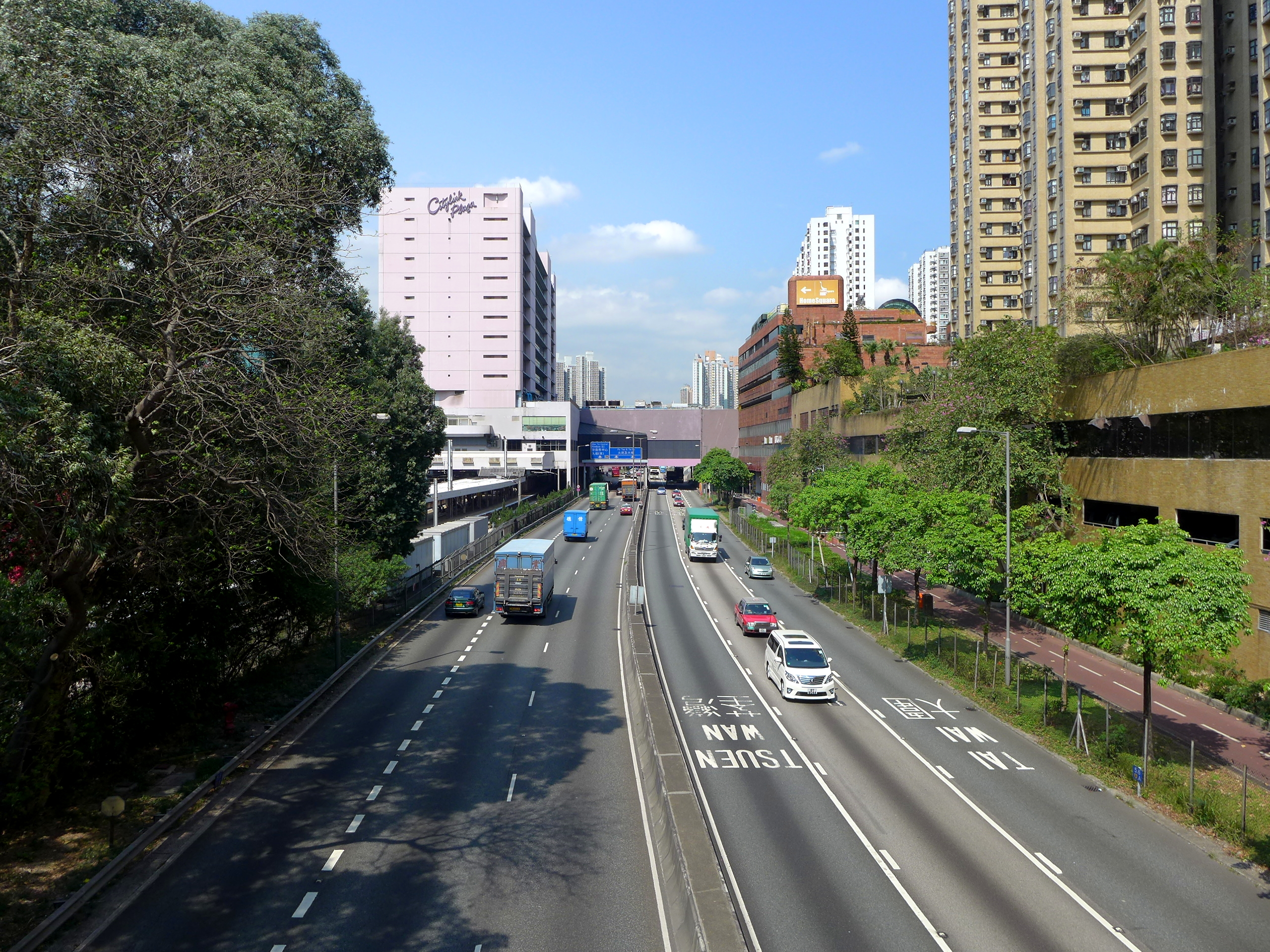
Tai Po Road Sha Tin Section in March 2014

== See also ==
- 2018 Hong Kong bus accident
- List of streets and roads in Hong Kong
- Castle Peak Road
- Mang Gui Kiu
- North Kowloon Magistracy, located at No. 292 Tai Po Road

Preceded by Shing Mun Tunnel Road	Hong Kong Route 9 Tai Po Road — Sha Tin	Succeeded by Tolo Highway
