= Ta Shui Wan =

Filled-in bay on Lantau Island

Coordinates: 22.3345°N 114.0298°E

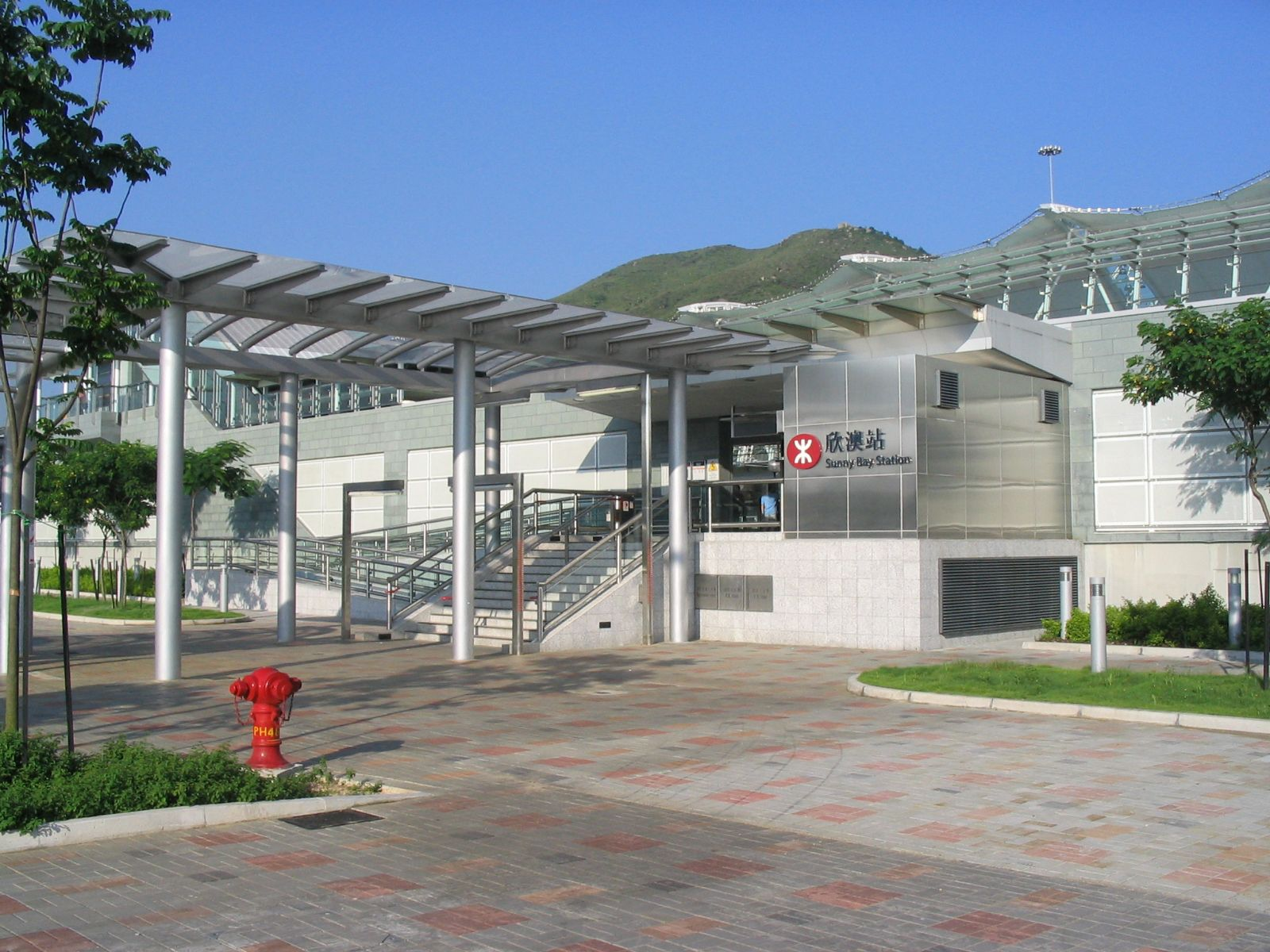
MTR Sunny Bay station

Ta Shui Wan (Chinese: 打水灣) was a bay in Yam O, Lantau Island, New Territories, Hong Kong, located between Tai Yam Teng (大陰頂) and Ngong Shuen Au (昂船凹). The bay was reclaimed to construct MTR Sunny Bay station.

Ta Shui Wan Ferry Pier (打水灣碼頭) was a ferry pier in Ta Shui Wan that provided ferry service to Tsing Lung Tau, Tsuen Wan. It was demolished as part of the land reclamation works.

The reclaimed land was renamed Sunny Bay (欣澳) under the requirement of the Walt Disney Company, the operator of Hong Kong Disneyland. Thus, the MTR station that was built there was called Sunny Bay station to fit the name change.

Hong Kong International Airport is located a couple of kilometers away, to the west.
