= Yam O =

Bay on Lantau Island

Coordinates: 22.32932°N 114.02281°E

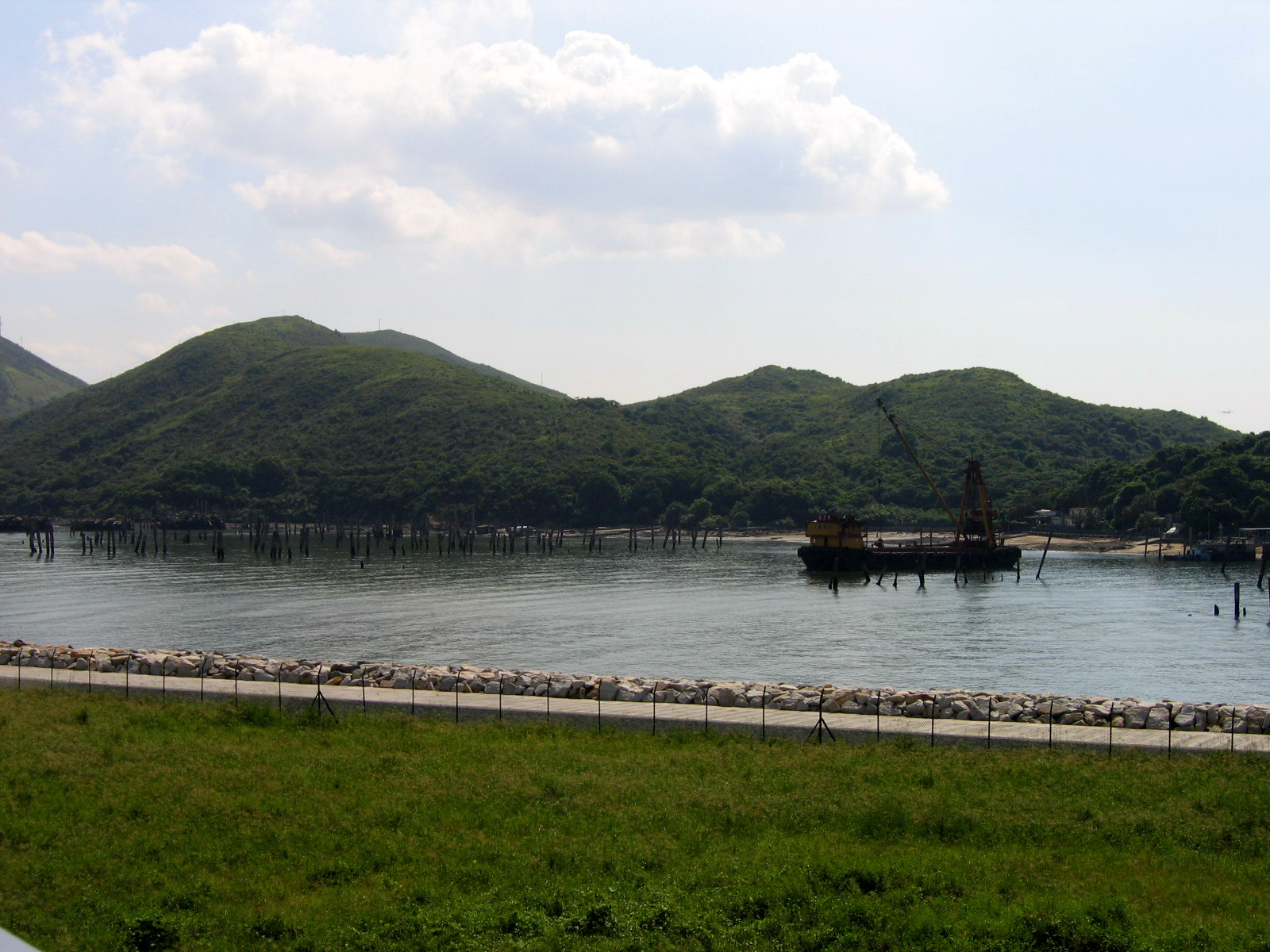
Yam O

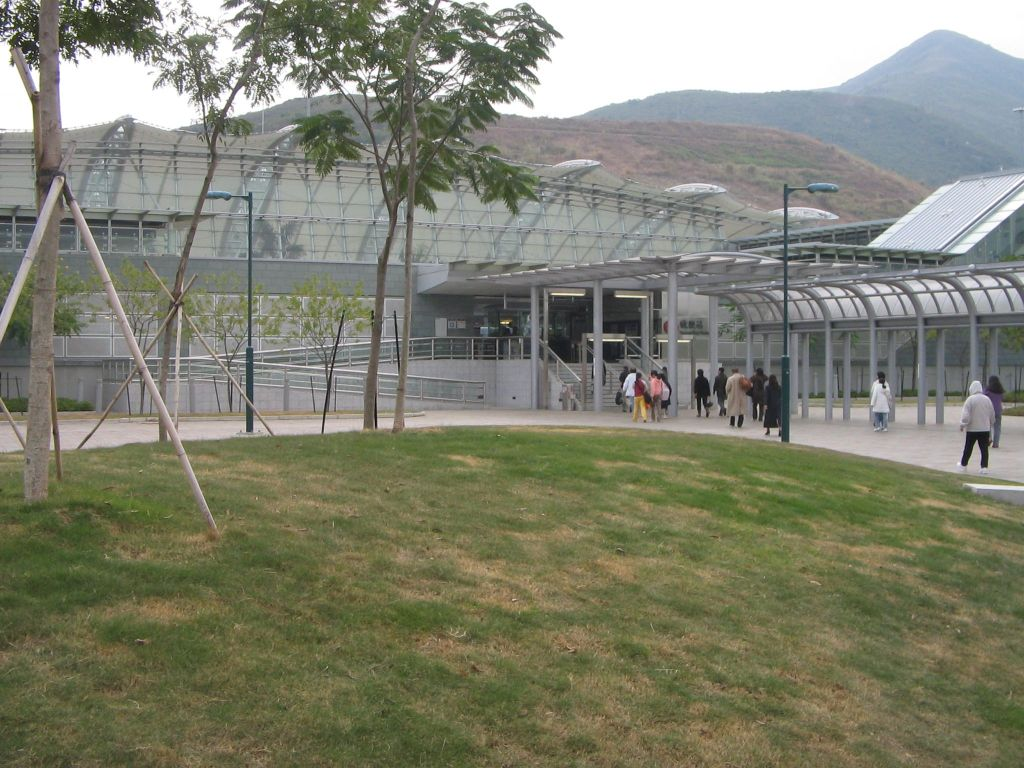
Sunny Bay MTR station, as viewed from the Public Transport Interchange

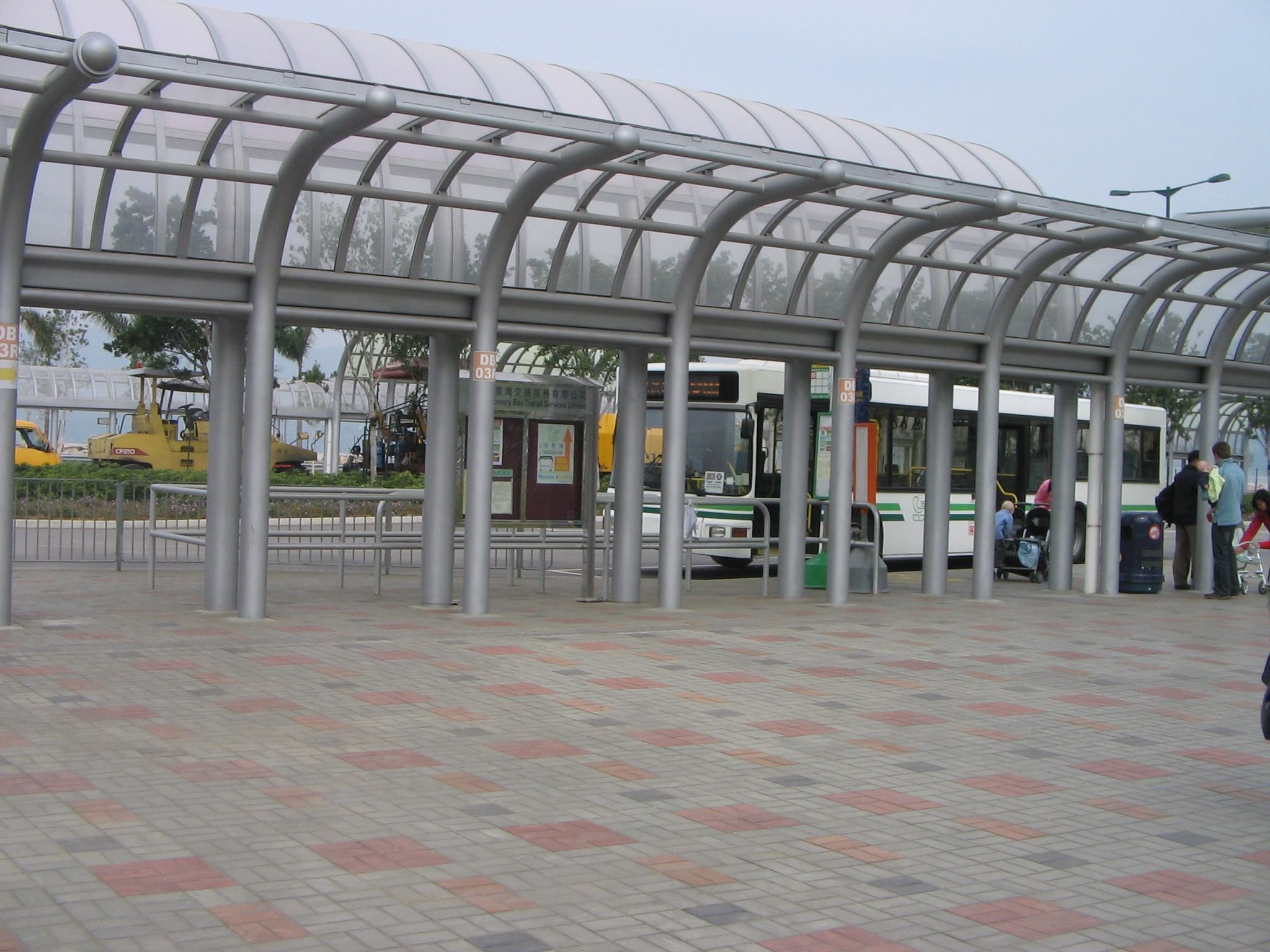
Sunny Bay Public Transport Interchange, with bus DB03R to Discovery Bay

Yam O (Chinese: 陰澳) is a bay located on the northeast shore of Lantau Island, in the New Territories of Hong Kong. It is part of the Ma Wan constituency of the Tsuen Wan District Council.

Yam O was the only natural lumber preservation zone in Hong Kong. Even today, travellers passing through Yam O can see natural lumber on stilts in the bay.

Today, Yam O is known for its interchange for the Disneyland Resort line via the nearby Sunny Bay MTR station, built on reclaimed land near Yam O.

== History ==
Plans were made in the PADS (Port and Airport Development Strategy) of 1989 to reclaim the bay for ancillary port facilities. The bay was eventually reclaimed in the 2000s under the Northeast Lantau Development Strategy to accommodate a tourism gateway to Hong Kong Disneyland; this included Sunny Bay station.

== Sunny Bay ==
Sunny Bay (Chinese: 欣澳; Cantonese Yale: Yān Ou) is a recent incarnation by the Hong Kong Government, which emerged after the plans to build Hong Kong Disneyland Resort on nearby Penny's Bay. This was done so because Yam (陰) in Cantonese literally means dark (the same word as the Mandarin yin, well known to most English speakers from the expression yin-yang); while Yan (欣) means happy - a significantly more favorable name to Disney. But according to Shuowen Jiezi, Yam (陰) originally is a geographical syntax which means "North of a hill or south of a body of water", so the change of the name is seen a violation of local culture and opposed by Hong Kong citizens and some Chinese language professionals.

Sunny Bay station is today also a transport interchange for Discovery Bay residents, being served by bus routes DB03P and DB03R.

After the opening of the Hong Kong-Zhuhai-Macao Bridge, Citybus Route B5 was introduced to facilitate travelers who need to transfer at Sunny Bay station for other destinations. The route also observes Disneyland during designated periods.

== See also ==
- Tsing Chau Tsai Peninsula
- Luk Keng Village
- List of places in Hong Kong
