= Kwai Tsing Container Terminals =

Container port in Hong Kong

Coordinates: 22°20′29″N 114°7′29″E

- Traditional Chinese: 葵青貨櫃碼頭
- Simplified Chinese: 葵青货柜码头
Transcriptions
Standard Mandarin
- Hanyu Pinyin: Kuíqīng Huòguì Mǎtóu
Yue: Cantonese
- Yale Romanization: Kwàih chīng fo gwaih máh tàuh
- Jyutping: Kwai4 cing1 fo3 gwai6 maa5 tau4

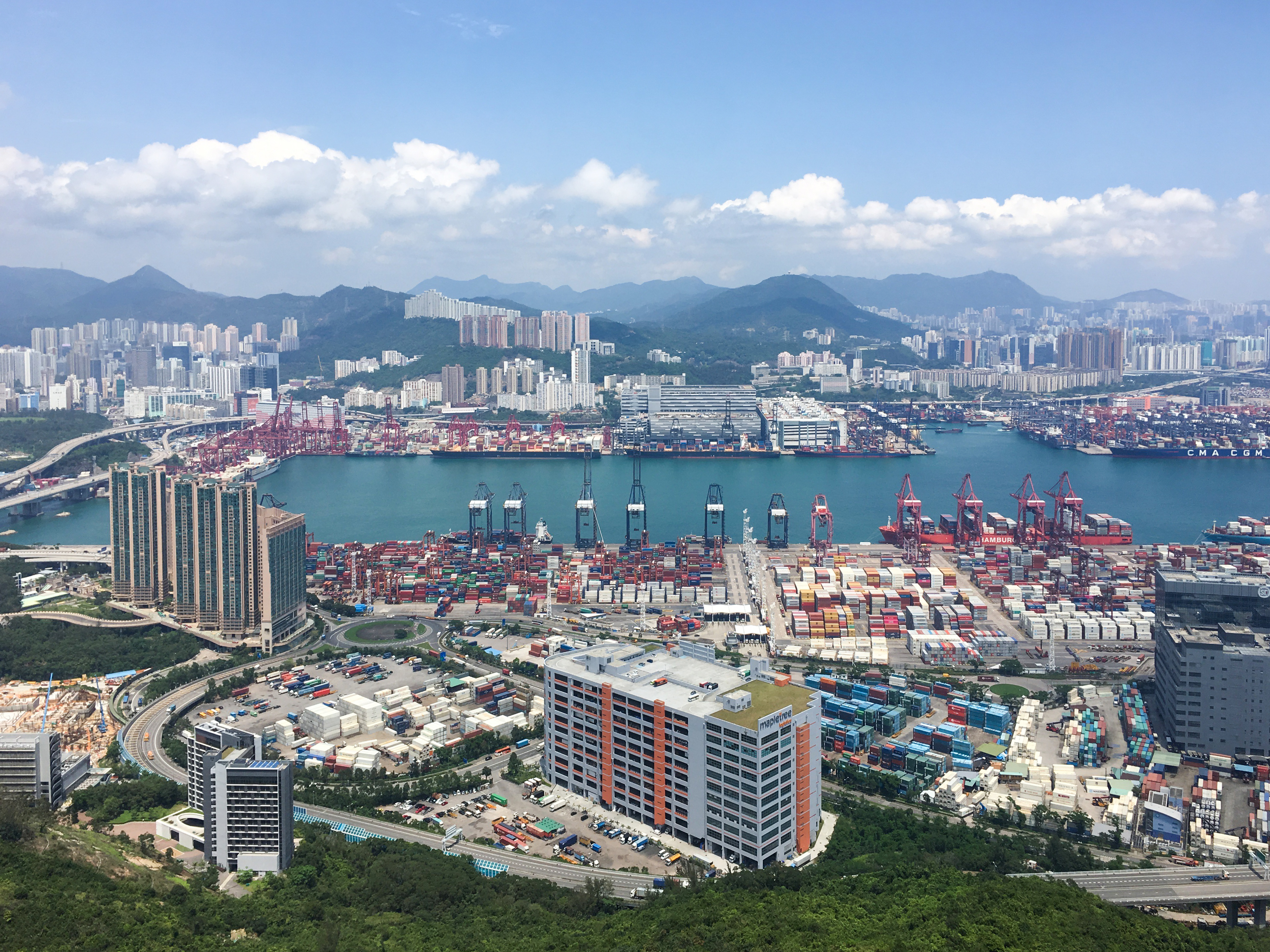
Kwai Tsing Container Terminals

Kwai Tsing Container Terminals is the main port facilities in the reclamation along Rambler Channel between Kwai Chung and Tsing Yi Island, Hong Kong. It evolved from four berths of Kwai Chung Container Port (Chinese: 葵涌貨櫃碼頭) completed in the 1970s. It later expanded with two berths in the 1980s. Two additional terminals were added adjoining to Stonecutters Island in the 1990s and it was renamed Kwai Chung Container Terminals. In the 2000s, Container Terminal 9 on Tsing Yi Island was completed, and the entire facility was renamed as Kwai Tsing Container Terminals.

It has been the eighth-busiest container port in the world since 2019, just after Shanghai, Singapore, Ningbo-Zhoushan, Shenzhen, Guangzhou, Busan and Qingdao.

== History ==
The Container Committee was appointed by the Governor Sir David Trench on 12 July 1966 to advise the government on the containerisation revolution in cargo handling. In early 1967 the committee declared that Hong Kong had to build the capacity to handle containers, otherwise the territory's economy would suffer and its port would be bypassed in favour of Singapore and Japan. The committee recommended the site at Kwai Chung. Two former islands on the Rambler Channel, Mong Chau and Pillar Island, were levelled and buried under the port.

While the port was under construction, a main road, Kwai Chung Road, was built to connect Kwai Chung and Kowloon. Container Port Road, a branch road of Kwai Chung Road, links the port with major industrial areas in Hong Kong.

The first container vessel to call on the new terminal, on 5 September 1972, was the Tokyo Bay.

Thanks to the success of the Kwai Chung Port, Hong Kong overtook the Port of New York and New Jersey in 1986 as the world's second-busiest port. In 1987 it won the title of world's busiest port from Rotterdam. The sunken remains of the hull of the RMS Queen Elizabeth are currently buried beneath the reclaimed land on which the port stands.

== Popular culture ==
- The Kwai Tsing Container Terminals were used as a filming location in the 1991 movie Double Impact.

== Terminals ==
The port consists of nine container terminals and their operators:

Terminal name	Abbreviation	Operator	Water depth (metres)	No. berths	Quay length (metres)	No. cranes	Area (square metres)	Capacity (kTEUs)	Year commissioned
Kwai Chung terminals
Container Terminal 1	CT1	Modern Terminals Limited	16.5	1		4			1972
Container Terminal 2	CT2	Modern Terminals Limited	16.5	1		4			1972
Container Terminal 3	CT3	Dubai Ports International (Hong Kong) Limited	14	1	305	4	167,000	>1,200	1972
Container Terminal 4	CT4	Hong Kong International Terminals Limited (HIT)	^	3		8			1976
Container Terminal 5	CT5	Modern Terminals Limited	16.5	1		6			1988
Container Terminal 6	CT6	Hong Kong International Terminals Limited	^	3		11			1989
Container Terminal 7	CT7	Hong Kong International Terminals Limited	^	4		15			1990
Container Terminal 8 (East)	CT8E	COSCO-HIT Terminals Limited	15.5	2	640	9	300,000	1,800	1993
Container Terminal 8 (West)	CT8W	Asia Container Terminals Limited	15.5	2	740	8	285,000	>2,000	1993
Tsing Yi terminals
Container Terminal 9 (North)	CT9N	Hong Kong International Terminals Limited	16.0	2	700	9	190,000	>2,600 (N&S)	2003
Container Terminal 9 (South)	CT9S	Modern Terminals Limited	16.5	4	1,240	16	490,000		2003

^ HIT terminals 4, 6, 7 and 9 (North): 14.2 to 16.0 metres

== See also ==
- Port of Hong Kong
