= Result Group =

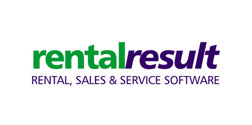
- Industry: Construction Equipment Management Software
- Founded: 1994
- Headquarters: Irvine, California, United States of America
- Key people: Derek Robson CEO, Retired
- Owner: Result Group Ltd
- Number of employees: 75+
- Website: https://rentalresult.com/

Result Group sold a specialist equipment management software application: rentalresult to companies renting and managing assets, e.g., cranes, tools, heavy equipment, aerial, modular space, computer hardware, and test & measuring equipment since 1994. It was privately owned and incorporated in Delaware and the United Kingdom. The company was acquired by Wynne Systems Inc of Irvine, CA in December 2015 and the RentalResult product continues as a brand under the Wynne umbrella.

== Markets ==
With customers in 26 countries across a number of different services industries including asset management, equipment rental, tool rental, accommodation rental, aerial rental, computer and electronics rental, crane rental, operated equipment (wet rental) and internal rental within the construction industry and oilfield services industry supported from offices in Elland UK, Phoenix AZ and Atlanta GA.

== Technology ==
Result Group provides a Java-based, Java EE compliant application that incorporates technologies such as asset tracking systems, Mobile Apps (iOS and Android), portals and touchscreen technology. rentalresult runs on a web services-based SOA platform providing connectivity to other third party applications and allowing for custom development of interactive modules.

== Software ==
The rentalresult software manages aspects of rental and equipment management, including rental order processing & fulfillment, sales management, asset lifecycle & inventory, maintenance and field-based servicing, financials and CRM. The software focuses on utilization, charging and billing methodologies, re-rental management, accessory & attachment management, pricing and discounting strategies including on-demand pricing and full financial asset management.

Specific modules also exist for operated equipment and timesheet management, used primarily by heavy equipment rental companies in the middle and far east, and by specialist rental companies; for example cranes, concrete pumps, large aerial equipment, in Europe and North America.

== Business intelligence ==
Reporting is provided through IBM Cognos Reportnet which is incorporated within the rentalresult licence. The system provides standard reports as well as allowing customers to add their own. Reports can be provided in listing format, or as Excel, PDF, HTML, XML or other formats. The tools also allow dashboards and scorecards to be created to monitor specific details. rentalresult also provides an Analytics package concentrating on metrics and KPI data relevant to the rental industry and equipment management.

The rentalresult application can also be referred to as a Tier 2 ERP system with 90% of Result Group’s customers using its fully integrated financial software.

rentalresult also operates a blog focusing on the rental industry.
