= Rental management software =

Type of software for real estate

The rental industry spans many different types of equipment from tools to heavy construction equipment, aerial to vehicles, party and event to computers and test and measurement equipment and highly specialized areas such as Crane and Temporary Accommodation rental. In the UK and some parts of Europe it is referred to as the Hire Industry.

== History ==
Like most software development, initial rental software systems were developed in the 1970s and 1980s as custom or bespoke solutions provided for individual rental companies and occurred in parallel in locations across the globe. In the last two decades a number of leading players have emerged providing solutions for everything from one or two user systems in a single store to international, multi-company and multi-location organizations.

The rental industry itself continues to adapt and re-shape, as different players enter the market and national boundaries become less significant. The introduction and expansion of increasing numbers of manufacturers, such as Volvo Rents, and CAT into the rental industry as direct providers of rental services is also re-shaping the way that individual rental software providers adapt their software.

== Rental Management Software Functionality ==
Rental management software should cover all aspects of a rental business in a systematic way including Financials (GL, AR and AP), Equipment Servicing, CRM and reporting functionality allowing rental businesses to achieve all their business analytics from within a single package. Rental management software that integrates with 'off-the-shelf' accounting software can provide a viable alternative to the 'all-in-one' solutions. There are distinct industry requirements which need to be managed within the software, with Utilization one of the most important. These special features include:

1. Reservations and Allocations management based on differing contract durations and customer requests.
2. Dispatch/Pick-Up/Returns Process Management with the ability to manage partial dispatches and returns including asset tracking and signature capture on delivery / pick up..
3. Accessories, Attachments & Kits including sale or return items such as fuel.
4. 'In Lieu of' or alternate items when equipment is not available as expected.
5. Transport management including ordering in outside haulage and keeping track of revenue and cost against delivery vehicles.
6. Product Exchanges and swap outs on live contracts
7. Site Moves/Drop Ship & Relocations within live contracts
8. Contract Charging Profile determining when and how charging is generated including flexibility on excess hours charges, charging by hour / day / week / month etc.
9. Product Service Units and clock hour recording and maintenance triggers
10. Bill Processing for long term rental contracts on specific cycles (continuation or recurring invoicing), automated off-rent billing and additional charge management.
11. Sale or Return consumables must be managed alongside rental products.
12. Rent to Purchase or Rent to Own agreements with pre-determined contracts to take ownership of assets at a specific point in the contract.
13. Product Revenue Accruals to provide revenue forecasts for rental contracts not billed at month end.
14. Product Utilization including Physical and Financial (dollar utilization) must be recorded.
15. Stock Locations and tracking of equipment between locations including inter-branch or inter-store transfers, and for larger businesses inter-company transfers.
16. Cash Customers/Contracts with cash drawer or till reconciliation and deposit management.
17. Sub-Rent or Re-Rent management including the ability to initiate rentals from third parties to cover contract obligations.
18. Product Service Inspection/Repair including the ability to trigger maintenance activity based on rental status, off-rent damage reports and clock hours or other service units.
19. Operated Equipment or Wet Rental where operators are sent out with the machine or equipment, and the rental charges are based on a combination of timesheet and standard rental charges. This is generally referred to as Timesheet Billing. This is common practice in crane rental in Europe and in larger equipment rental in India and Asia.
20. The ability to manage Safety Critical Equipment or Safety Critical Plant including the recording of inspection and examination certificates.
21. Rental Rate Optimization and Yield Management.
22. Dry hire where equipment is rented out without any additional operators to set up the equipment.

For rental business' working across country boundaries then additional special functionality may include multi-currency, multi-tax jurisdiction and multi-lingual needs.

There are also specialized forms of rental which are either a precursor to a sale of a large piece of equipment, or a special business model normally referred to as Rent-to-own. This specialized area has its own industry body and multiple rental companies across the world are represented.

== Implementing rental software ==
Implementing rental software requires the same basic principles as any other software implementation. The International Rental News and Rental Equipment Register Magazines both offer advice on software implementation.

== Real Estate Rental Management Software ==
Rental management software for real estate properties can include end-to-end functionality such as marketing, rental applications, tenant screening, property management, payment processing, and accounting.

The use of software in the property rental industry has become more frequent as large property management companies now account for one-third of the annual rentals in the United States.

== Oilfield Rental Management Software ==
Oilfield Rental Management Software helps equipment rental and oilfield service companies with field ticket management, rentals automatic invoicing, manage and track company assets, invoicing and billing etc.

== Industry bodies ==
There is no specific industry body for rental software companies, although most of the larger companies work with either the American Rental Association or the European Rental Association. The American Rental Association also has industry approved metrics that it recommends software providers follow. Country specific software companies will work with their own local rental associations.

In Australia, the body is Hire and Rental Industry Association. In New Zealand the association is Hire Industry Association NZ.
