= Tunnel construction =

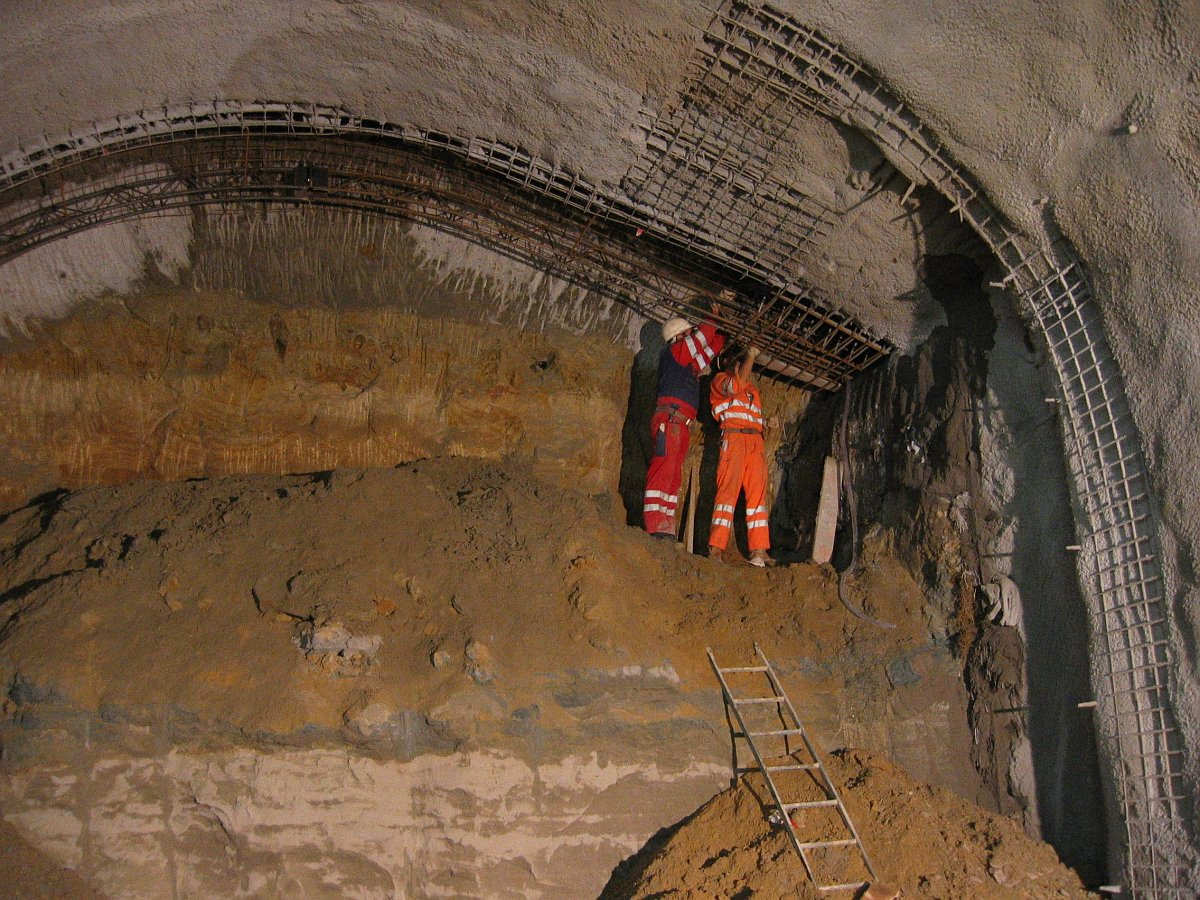
Tunnel Construction

Tunnels are dug in types of materials varying from soft clay to hard rock. The method of tunnel construction depends on such factors as the ground conditions, the ground water conditions, the length and diameter of the tunnel drive, the depth of the tunnel, the logistics of supporting the tunnel excavation, the final use and shape of the tunnel and appropriate risk management. Tunnel construction is a subset of underground construction.

There are three basic types of tunnel construction in common use:

- Cut-and-cover tunnel, constructed in a shallow trench and then covered over.
- Bored tunnel, constructed in situ, without removing the ground above. They are usually of circular or horseshoe cross-section. Some concepts of underground mining apply. Modern techniques include shotcrete used in the new Austrian tunnelling method, use of a tunnel boring machine (TBM) or tunnelling shield. But still tunnels are constructed which are secured with pit props and shoring and then are steined or timer supports are set. Techniques known from barrel vaults are helpful.
- Immersed tube tunnel, sunk into a body of water and laid on or buried just under its bed.

== Cost ==
In 2017 experiences show that city subway TBM tunnels cost approximately 500 Million EUR per kilometer. In Switzerland a kilometer of motorway tunnel was roughly calculated at 300 Million CHF, at the time 200 Million Eur. The undersea tunnel between Denmark and Germany is planned for 425 Million per km, in 2015.

== Cut-and-cover ==
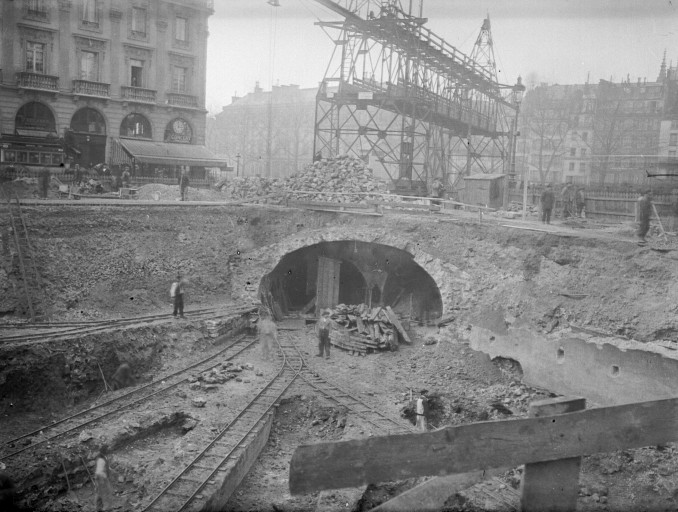
Cut-and-cover construction of the Paris Métro in France

Cut-and-cover is a simple method of construction for shallow tunnels where a trench is excavated and roofed over with an overhead support system strong enough to carry the load of what is to be built above the tunnel. Two basic forms of cut-and-cover tunnelling are available:

- Bottom-up method: A trench is excavated, with ground support as necessary, and the tunnel is constructed in it. The tunnel may be of in situ concrete, precast concrete, precast arches, or corrugated steel arches; in early days brickwork was used. The trench is then carefully back-filled and the surface is reinstated.
- Top-down method: Side support walls and capping beams are constructed from ground level by such methods as slurry walling or contiguous bored piling. Then a shallow excavation allows making the tunnel roof of precast beams or in situ concrete. The surface is then reinstated except for access openings. This allows early reinstatement of roadways, services and other surface features. Excavation then takes place under the permanent tunnel roof, and the base slab is constructed.

Shallow tunnels are often of the cut-and-cover type (if under water, of the immersed-tube type), while deep tunnels are excavated, often using a tunnelling shield. For intermediate levels, both methods are possible.

Large cut-and-cover boxes are often used for underground metro stations, such as Canary Wharf tube station in London. This construction form generally has two levels, which allows economical arrangements for ticket hall, station platforms, passenger access and emergency egress, ventilation and smoke control, staff rooms, and equipment rooms. The interior of Canary Wharf station has been likened to an underground cathedral, owing to the sheer size of the excavation. This contrasts with many traditional stations on London Underground, where bored tunnels were used for stations and passenger access. Nevertheless, the original parts of the London Underground network, the Metropolitan and District Railways, were constructed using cut-and-cover. These lines pre-dated electric traction and the proximity to the surface was useful to ventilate the inevitable smoke and steam.

A major disadvantage of cut-and-cover is the widespread disruption generated at the surface level during construction. This, and the availability of electric traction, brought about London Underground's switch to bored tunnels at a deeper level towards the end of the 19th century.

== Boring machines ==
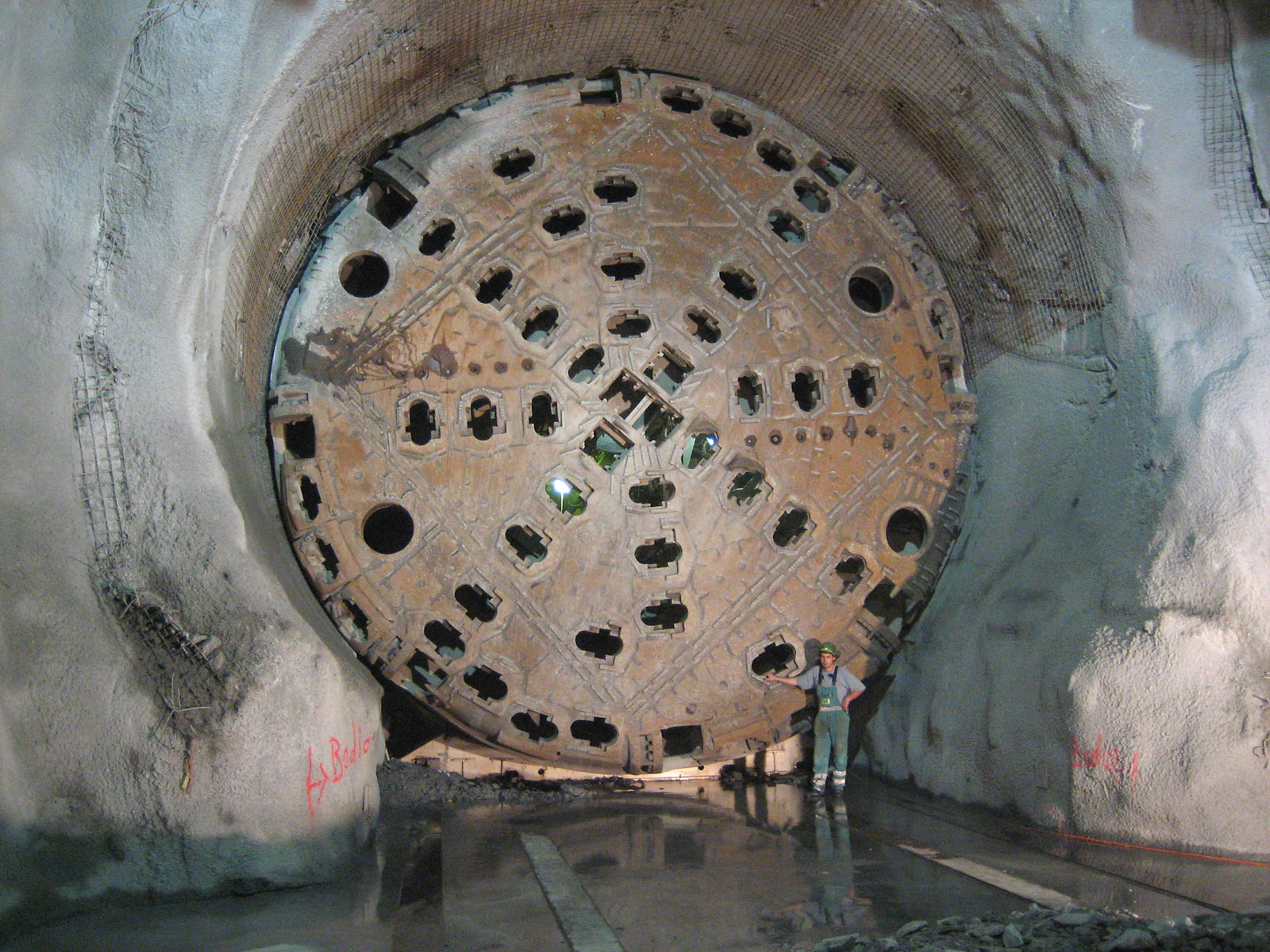
A workman is dwarfed by the tunnel boring machine used to excavate the Gotthard Base Tunnel (Switzerland), the world's longest.

Tunnel boring machines and associated back-up systems are used to highly automate the entire tunnelling process, reducing tunnelling costs. In certain predominantly urban applications, tunnel boring is viewed as quick and cost effective alternative to laying surface rails and roads. Expensive compulsory purchase of buildings and land, with potentially lengthy planning inquiries, is eliminated. Disadvantages of TBMs arise from their usually large size – the difficulty of transporting the large TBM to the site of tunnel construction, or (alternatively) the high cost of assembling the TBM on-site, often within the confines of the tunnel being constructed.

There are a variety of TBM designs that can operate in a variety of conditions, from hard rock to soft water-bearing ground. Some types of TBMs, the bentonite slurry and earth-pressure balance machines, have pressurised compartments at the front end, allowing them to be used in difficult conditions below the water table. This pressurizes the ground ahead of the TBM cutter head to balance the water pressure. The operators work in normal air pressure behind the pressurised compartment, but may occasionally have to enter that compartment to renew or repair the cutters. This requires special precautions, such as local ground treatment or halting the TBM at a position free from water. Despite these difficulties, TBMs are now preferred over the older method of tunnelling in compressed air, with an air lock/decompression chamber some way back from the TBM, which required operators to work in high pressure and go through decompression procedures at the end of their shifts, much like deep-sea divers.

In February 2010, Aker Wirth delivered a TBM to Switzerland, for the expansion of the Linth–Limmern Power Stations located south of Linthal in the canton of Glarus. The borehole has a diameter of 8.03 metres (26.3 ft). The four TBMs used for excavating the 57-kilometre (35 mi) Gotthard Base Tunnel, in Switzerland, had a diameter of about 9 metres (30 ft). A larger TBM was built to bore the Green Heart Tunnel (Dutch: Tunnel Groene Hart) as part of the HSL-Zuid in the Netherlands, with a diameter of 14.87 metres (48.8 ft). This in turn was superseded by the Madrid M30 ringroad, Spain, and the Chong Ming tunnels in Shanghai, China. All of these machines were built at least partly by Herrenknecht. As of January 2023, the largest TBM by head diameter ever built was the Tuen Mun–Chek Lap Kok TBM, a 17.6-metre (58 ft) diameter machine built by Herrenknecht, for the Tuen Mun-Chek Lap Kok Link in Hong Kong.

== Clay-kicking ==
Clay-kicking is a specialised method developed in the United Kingdom of digging tunnels in strong clay-based soil structures. Unlike previous manual methods of using mattocks which relied on the soil structure to be hard, clay-kicking was relatively silent and hence did not harm soft clay-based structures. The clay-kicker lies on a plank at a 45-degree angle away from the working face and inserts a tool with a cup-like rounded end with the feet. Turning the tool manually, the kicker extracts a section of soil, which is then placed on the waste extract.

Used in Victorian civil engineering, the method found favour in the renewal of Britain's ancient sewerage systems, by not having to remove all property or infrastructure to create a small tunnel system. During the First World War, the system was used by Royal Engineer tunnelling companies to put mines beneath the German Empire lines. The method was virtually silent and so not susceptible to listening methods of detection.

== Shafts ==
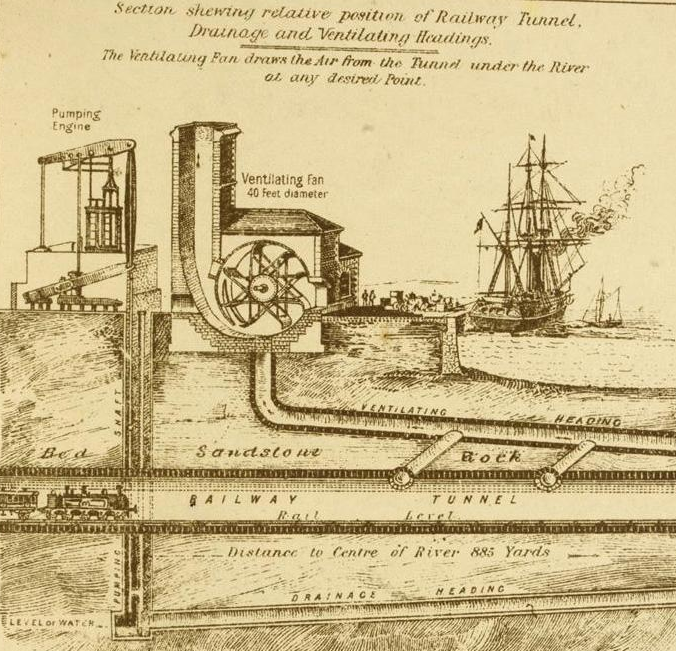
1886 illustration showing the ventilation and drainage system of the Mersey railway tunnel

A temporary access shaft is sometimes necessary during the excavation of a tunnel. They are usually circular and go straight down until they reach the level at which the tunnel is going to be built. A shaft normally has concrete walls and is usually built to be permanent. Once the access shafts are complete, TBMs are lowered to the bottom and excavation can start. Shafts are the main entrance in and out of the tunnel until the project is completed. If a tunnel is going to be long, multiple shafts at various locations may be bored so that entrance to the tunnel is closer to the unexcavated area.

Once construction is complete, construction access shafts are often used as ventilation shafts, and may also be used as emergency exits.

== Sprayed concrete techniques ==
The New Austrian Tunneling Method (NATM) was developed in the 1960s and is the best known of a number of engineering practices that use calculated and empirical measurements to provide safe support to the tunnel lining. The main idea of this method is to use the geological stress of the surrounding rock mass to stabilize the tunnel, by allowing a measured relaxation and stress reassignment into the surrounding rock to prevent full loads becoming imposed on the supports. Based on geotechnical measurements, an optimal cross section is computed. The excavation is protected by a layer of sprayed concrete, commonly referred to as shotcrete. Other support measures can include steel arches, rock bolts and mesh. Technological developments in sprayed concrete technology have resulted in steel and polypropylene fibres being added to the concrete mix to improve lining strength. This creates a natural load-bearing ring, which minimizes the rock's deformation.

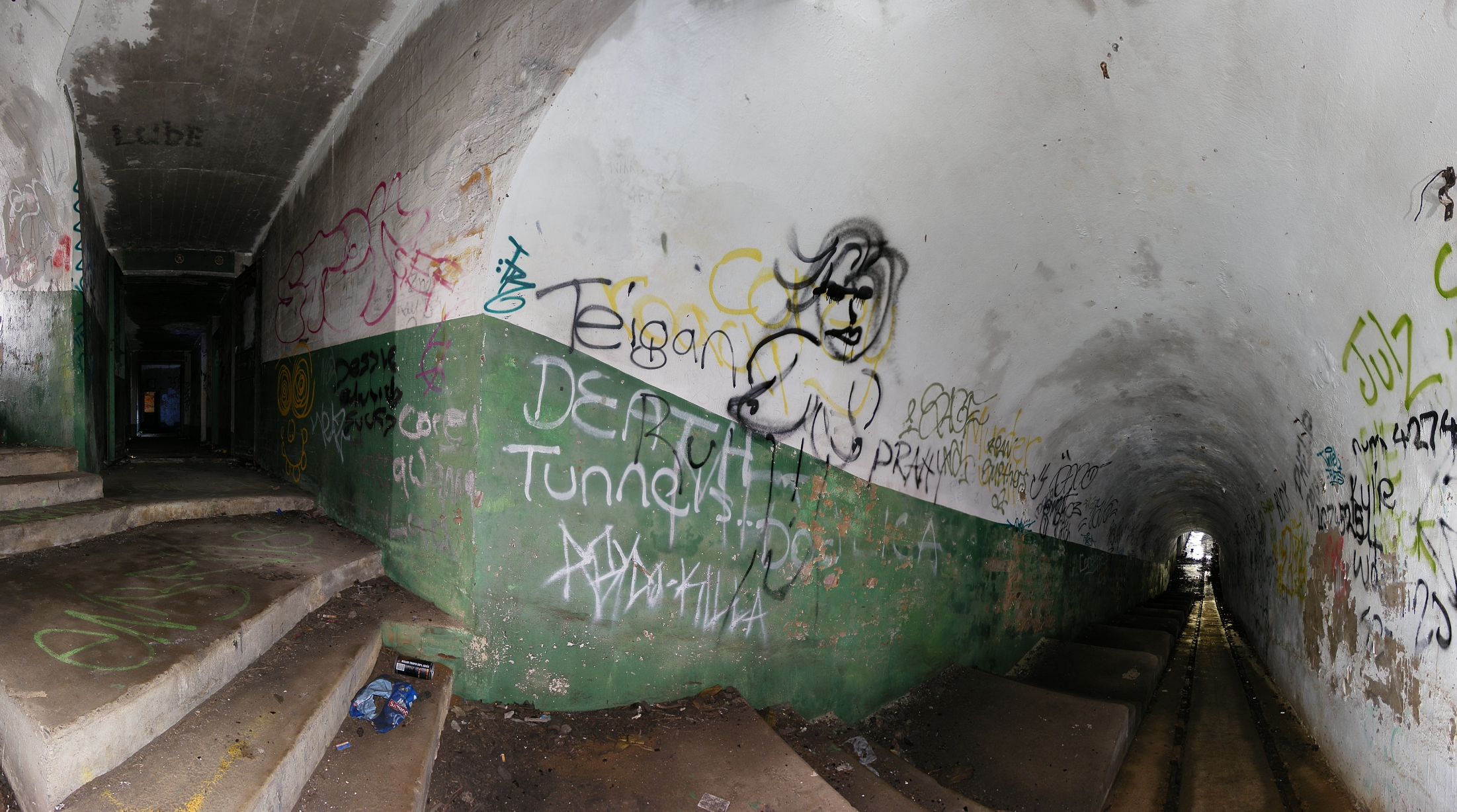
Illowra Battery utility tunnel, Port Kembla. One of many bunkers south of Sydney.

By special monitoring the NATM method is flexible, even at surprising changes of the geomechanical rock consistency during the tunneling work. The measured rock properties lead to appropriate tools for tunnel strengthening. In the last decades also soft ground excavations up to 10 kilometres (6.2 mi) became usual.

== Pipe jacking ==
In pipe jacking, hydraulic jacks are used to push specially made pipes through the ground behind a TBM or shield. This method is commonly used to create tunnels under existing structures, such as roads or railways. Tunnels constructed by pipe jacking are normally small diameter bores with a maximum size of around 3.2 metres (10 ft).

== Box jacking ==
Box jacking is similar to pipe jacking, but instead of jacking tubes, a box-shaped tunnel is used. Jacked boxes can be a much larger span than a pipe jack, with the span of some box jacks in excess of 20 metres (66 ft). A cutting head is normally used at the front of the box being jacked, and spoil removal is normally by excavator from within the box. Recent developments of the Jacked Arch and Jacked deck have enabled longer and larger structures to be installed to close accuracy.

== Underwater tunnels ==
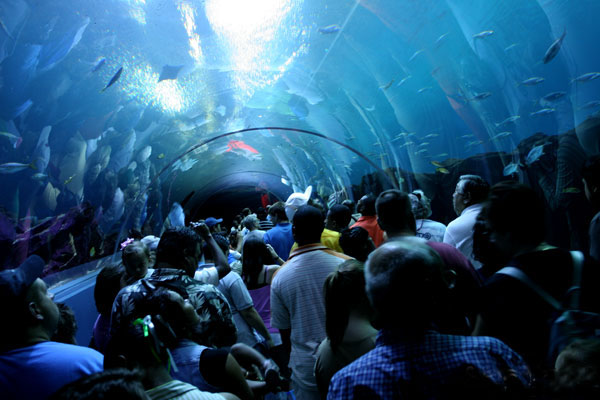
Shark tunnel at the Georgia Aquarium

There are also several approaches to underwater tunnels, the two most common being bored tunnels or immersed tubes, examples are Bjørvika Tunnel and Marmaray. Submerged floating tunnels are a novel approach under consideration; however, no such tunnels have been constructed to date.

== Land tunnels ==
A new kind of tunnels is used to reduce the environmental impact of motorways or railways: land tunnels. These are not underground tunnels, but built at ground level. The urban area next to the tunnel can be raised with ground or buildings (for instance parking facilities) to improve the integration of the tunnel in the immediate area. A good early example of such a land tunnel is the A2 motorway tunnel at Leidsche Rijn, near the Dutch city of Utrecht.

== Temporary way ==
During construction of a tunnel it is often convenient to install a temporary railway, particularly to remove excavated spoil, often narrow gauge so that it can be double track to allow the operation of empty and loaded trains at the same time. The temporary way is replaced by the permanent way at completion, thus explaining the term "Perway".

== Enlargement ==
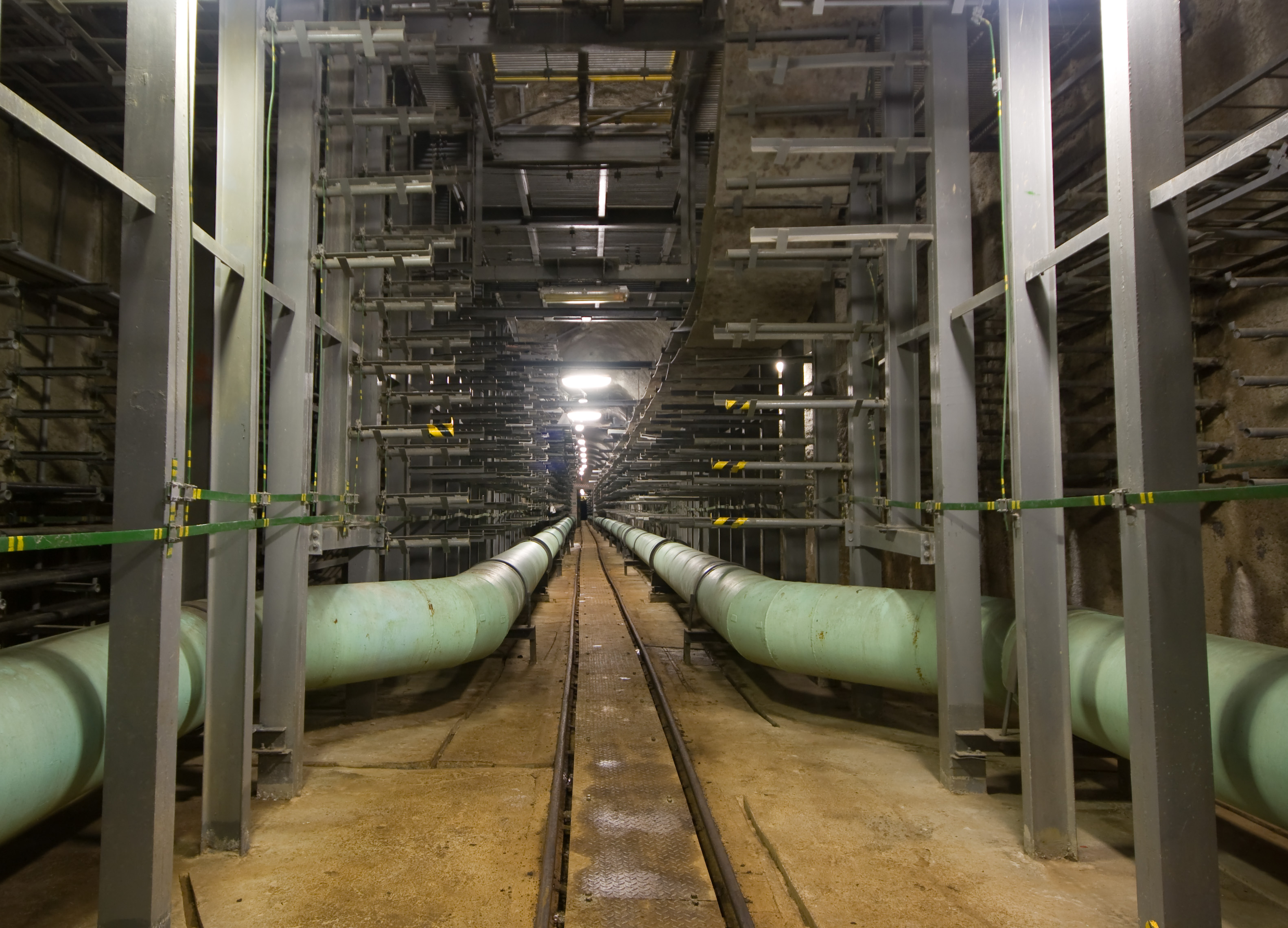
A utility tunnel in Prague

The vehicles or traffic using a tunnel can outgrow it, requiring replacement or enlargement:

- The 1832 double-track mile-long tunnel from Edge Hill to Lime Street in Liverpool was near totally removed, apart from a 50-metre section at Edge Hill and a section nearer to Lime Street, as four tracks were required. The tunnel was dug out into a very deep four-track cutting, with short tunnels in places along the cutting. Train services were not interrupted as the work progressed. There are other occurrences of tunnels being replaced by open cuts, for example, the Auburn Tunnel.
- The Farnworth Tunnel in England was enlarged using a tunnel boring machine (TBM) in 2015. The Rhyndaston Tunnel was enlarged using a borrowed TBM so as to be able to take ISO containers.

== Open building pit ==
An open building pit consists of a horizontal and a vertical boundary that keeps groundwater and soil out of the pit. There are several potential alternatives and combinations for (horizontal and vertical) building pit boundaries. The most important difference with cut-and-cover is that the open building pit is muted after tunnel construction; no roof is placed.

== See also ==
- Microtunneling – Tunnel construction technique
- Drilling and blasting – Excavation method using explosives
- Hydraulic splitter – Portable hydraulic tool for breaking rocks
