= Mobile architecture =

In the past computers needed to be disconnected from their internal network if they needed to be taken or moved anywhere. Mobile architecture allows maintaining this connection whilst during transit. Each day the number of mobile devices is increasing, mobile architecture is the pieces of technology needed to create a rich, connected user experience. Currently, there is a lack of uniform interoperability plans and implementation. There is a lack of common industry view on the architectural framework. This increases costs and slows down 3rd party mobile development. An open approach is required across all industries to achieve the same end results and services.

== Important components of a mobile architecture ==
- Scalability – A Architecture must be able to be utilized with all recovery requirements on both large and small scale.
- Secure – Encryption is important, transmission protocols must support encryption (SSL) secure transit such as HTTPS
- Reliable – Reliability is always important in all technologies and mobile architecture is no different.

The basic and detailed architecture of the Mobile device consists of Hardware and Software architecture. The main hardware components of the mobile phone are the application processor that controls all other components of the device such as display, keypad, power, audio, video etc. The radio signals are handled by base band processor which in turn communicates with other processors to use their functionality. Power and audio processor controls the functioning of speaker and microphone with the help of application processor. Subscriber Identification Module (SIM) contains the details about the subscriber.

== Best practices ==
- Data should be populated for database views
- Use version numbers to track updates during synchronization
- Maintain only necessary user details in middle ware
- The application should recognize when CPU battery is low and adjust background running to low to extend battery power
- UI on multiple screens should have common elements

== Future ==
A consortium of companies are pushing for products and services to be based on open, global standards, protocols and interfaces and are not locked to proprietary technologies. The applications layer to be bearer agnostic, for example:

- Global System for Mobile Communications (GSM),
- General Packet Radio Service (GPRS),
- Enhanced Data rates for GSM Evolution (EDGE),
- Code-division multiple access (CDMA),
- Universal Mobile Telecommunications System (UMTS).

The architecture framework and service enablers will be independent of operating systems. There will be support for inseparability of applications and platforms, seamless geographic and inter-generational roaming.

== See also ==
- Mobile Asset Management
- Field Service Management
- Device Management
- Secure Mobile Architecture (SMA)
