= Poundit =

Filipino e-commerce website

- Company type: Private
- Industry: Internet
- Founded: 2014; 12 years ago
- Founder: Kristian Salvo
- Headquarters: 707 Greenbelt Mansions, Perea St., Legaspi Village, Makati, Philippines
- Area served: Philippines
- Key people: Kristian Salvo (CEO and Founder)
- Services: E-commerce (Online shopping)
- Website: poundit.com

Poundit is a privately held online e-commerce website based in the Philippines. The website was founded by former BlackBerry Philippines manager Kristian Salvo in 2014. It headquartered in Makati, Philippines. The company set up an end-to-end service for the Philippine market including sales, electronics, gadgets, home appliances, and accessories.

== Funding ==
In September 2017, Poundit has received ₱32 million worth of operating budget from the Singapore venture capital Cocoon, which helped it to grow its online business in the Philippines.
