= Rental store =

Rental store, shop or market may refer to:

- Video rental shop
- Rent-to-own
- Car rental
- Equipment rental
