= Rental utilization =

Utilization is the primary method by which tool rental companies measure asset performance. In its most basic form it measures the actual revenue earned by assets against the potential revenue they could have earned.

== Calculations ==
Rental utilization is divided into a number of different calculations, and not all companies work precisely the same way. In general terms however there are two key calculations: the physical utilization on the asset, which is measured based on the number of available days for rental against the number of days actually rented. (This may also be measured in hours for certain types of equipment), and the financial utilization on the asset (referred to in North America as $ Utilization) which is measured as the rental revenue achieved over a period of time against the potential revenue that could have been achieved based on a target or standard, non-discounted rate. Physical utilization is also sometimes referred to as spot utilization, where a rental company looks at its current utilization of assets based on a single moment in time (e.g. now, 9 am today, etc.).

Utilization calculations may be varied based on many different factors. For example:

- A company with equipment which requires preventative maintenance activities every 2 weeks, may decide that the number of available days in the month is decreased as it will unavailable due to maintenance for 2 days out of each month.
- Some rental businesses give "free days" on rental contract billing processes, for example on a national or public holiday, and therefore the equipment does not earn any money on those days, even though it is physically on rent.
- Some companies charge minimum rates, for example you may rent an excavator for 1 day, but be charged a three-day minimum. The Physical utilization will therefore be 100% on the day, but the financial utilization is actually 300% as you've earned 3 days revenue for 1 day's work.
- Rental Software is normally required to assist management teams in measuring and calculating utilization figures.
- Asset Tracking software may also be important in increasing or managing utilization figures.

Utilization in this context is heavily linked to profitability. Low physical utilization may be mitigated by keeping rental rates high, high physical utilization normally justifies keeping rental rates lower. Different types of equipment may also alter the relationship between rates and utilization.

== See also ==
Renting
