= Secure Mobile Architecture =

Mobile telephony (cellular) has become a commonplace aspect of modern life. Mobile computing is less well established than mobile telephony, partly because of the lack of a common standard infrastructure for secure seamless mobile computing for the Internet. With the increasing number of mobile workers, a secure mobile architecture specification is needed to allow businesses and individuals to maintain secure connections when moving or mobile.

Secure Mobile Architecture (SMA) grew from work in The Open Group's (TOG) Mobile Management Forum (MMF). The MMF developed a demonstration of proprietary seamless secure session management across different networks, which was given at The Open Group Conference in Berlin, April 2001. This led to the development by the MMF together with The Open Group Directory Interoperability Forum (DIF) of the Business Scenario – The Executive on the Move. This business scenario described the requirements for directories to support mobile computing. The Open Group then worked on a Challenge to vendors of directories and related products to provide support for mobile computing. The SMA activity became a task group in The Open Group and the participants developed the Secure Mobile Architecture (SMA) over a three-year period, publishing in February 2004.

The architecture described in the SMA Vision and Architecture was developed by a team of Boeing, Lockheed-Martin, Motorola, IBM, Hewlett-Packard, Netmotion Wireless, Wheatstone Consulting and the University of St Thomas. Its central features were the use of the Host Identity Protocol (HIP), cryptographic identities, secure directories, and location to make policy-based information about users and the network available to applications, management systems, and intelligent network components. A directory schema appropriate for this purpose was developed and worked out in detail.

== Secure Mobile Architecture Components ==
- Host Identity Payload (HIP): provides a mechanism by which the identity of the equipment or its user is carried securely in every packet.
- Public Key Infrastructure (PKI): provides cryptographic identities for the HIP protocol.
- Secure Directory: retains information about the user, the owner, the machine, and other policy relevant information.
- Location: the location of the user or computing device is an integral part of the secure and mobile architecture.

Starting in 2004, Boeing developed an SMA implementation for its Intranet-connected moving production lines and its secure mobile computing requirements. The intent is to provide the Boeing implementation of SMA as an open-source, open-standards approach to secure mobile computing. The Open Group is envisioned to be the holder of that implementation. An SMA Alliance is being considered to expand the broadened use of SMA for enterprises or any organization in need of a secure seamless mobile computing infrastructure.

== See also ==
- Mobile Architecture
