= European Rental Association =

Equipment rental trade association

ERA - European Rental Association
- Secretariat: Brussels, Belgium
- Official languages: English
- Type: Trade association

Government
  - President: Pierre Boels, Boels Rental
- Establishment: 2006

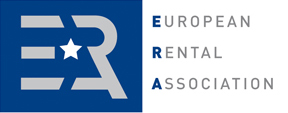
ERA logo

The ERA - European Rental Association is a trade association representing the equipment rental sector in Europe.

== History and mission ==
ERA was set up in 2006 to promote and represent the equipment rental industry, which was largely overlooked. It is seen as being an integral part of the construction industry . ERA represents over 5,000 rental companies in Europe, either directly or through its 15 rental association members (14 national associations and one international).

Its work focuses on 7 main areas:

- Promotion of the rental concept
- Technical issues and equipment
- Statistics on the European rental market
- Sustainability in the rental industry
- Harmonisation of national regulations in Europe
- Awareness of the challenges of the future of the rental industry
- Support for rental associations

== Structure ==
ERA, like most trade associations, uses working committees which meet regularly throughout the year and develop deliverables that may be of use to member companies and associations.

There are five committees and two working groups:

• Technical Committee
• National Associations Committee
• Promotion Committee
• Statistics Committee
• Sustainability Committee

• Future Group

• Cybersecurity working group

== Members ==
Direct members of ERA may either be rental associations or rental companies with operations in Europe. Equipment manufacturers and other suppliers to the rental industry may become associate members.

== International exhibitions and events ==
ERA is the co-organiser of the International Rental Exhibition, IRE, which takes place every 3 years and is the largest European trade show in the equipment rental business. The event raises the profile of the rental industry in Europe, standing alongside Intermat and Bauma, the two other large construction exhibitions in Europe.

== See also ==
- Equipment rental
- Equipment service management and rental
- Operated equipment rental
- Renting
- Rental accessories and attachments
- Rental relocation
