= Tuen Mun–Chek Lap Kok Link =

Hong Kong road infrastructure project

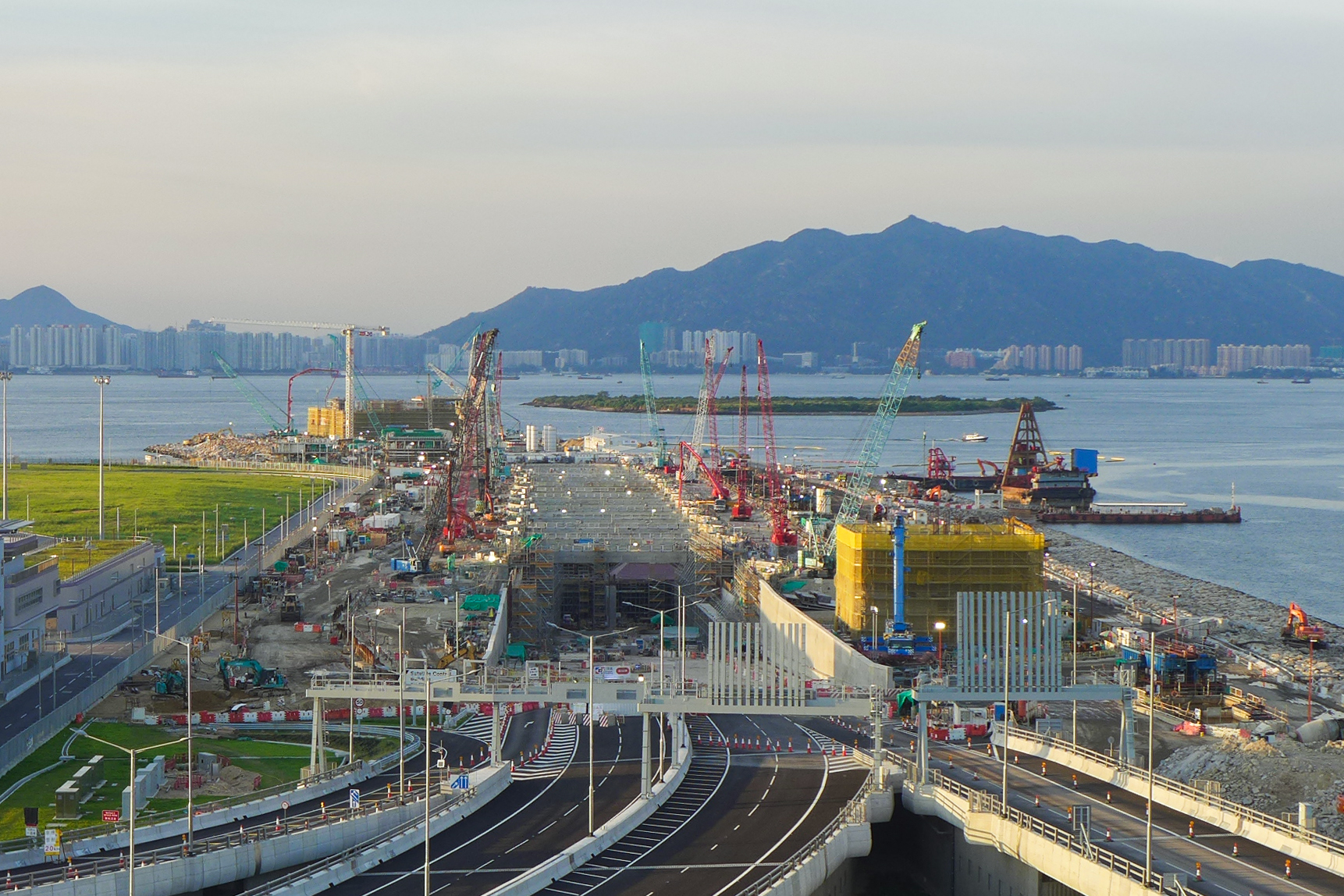
- Tuen Mun–Chek Lap Kok Link under construction
- Interactive map of Tuen Mun–Chek Lap Kok Link

Overview
- Official name: Shun Long Road (for the Southern Connection)
- Location: New Territories, Hong Kong
- Coordinates: 22°18′24.6″N 113°57′52″E
- Status: Active
- Crosses: Urmston Road
- Start: Lung Fu Road, Tuen Mun
- End: Chek Lap Kok, Lantau Island

Operation
- Opened: Shun Long Road (Southern Connection) - 24 October 2018; 7 years ago Northern Connection (Tuen Mun-Chek Lap Kok Tunnel) - 27 December 2020; 5 years ago
- Owner: Hong Kong Government
- Traffic: Automotive
- Toll: No

Technical
- Length: 5 kilometres (3.1 mi) (sub-sea tunnel)
- No. of lanes: 4 lanes (2 lanes per direction)
- Operating speed: 80 kilometres per hour (50 mph)

The Tuen Mun–Chek Lap Kok Link (Chinese: 屯門至赤鱲角連接路, abbreviated as TM–CLKL) is a road project in the New Territories, Hong Kong. It comprises two elements: the "Northern Connection" and the "Southern Connection". The Northern Connection comprises an undersea tunnel crossing the Urmston Road, linking Tuen Mun to the "Boundary Crossing Facilities" (BCF), an artificial peninsula connected to Hong Kong International Airport. The Southern Connection, officially named Shun Long Road (順朗路), comprises viaducts linking the BCF to North Lantau Highway on Lantau Island.

The construction of the link has helped facilitate travel between the Northwest New Territories (Tuen Mun and Yuen Long Districts) and the Hong Kong International Airport and the Hong Kong–Zhuhai–Macau Bridge (Hong Kong Port).

Though the project lies entirely within Hong Kong territory, its construction is associated with the new Hong Kong–Zhuhai–Macau Bridge (HZMB). The estimated cost of the design, site investigation, and construction of the TM–CLKL (including associated works, like land reclamation) is about HK$46.71 billion. The Southern Connection mainline opened on 24 October 2018 to tie in with HZMB's commissioning and the remaining Northern Connection to Tuen Mun opened on 27 December 2020.

== History ==
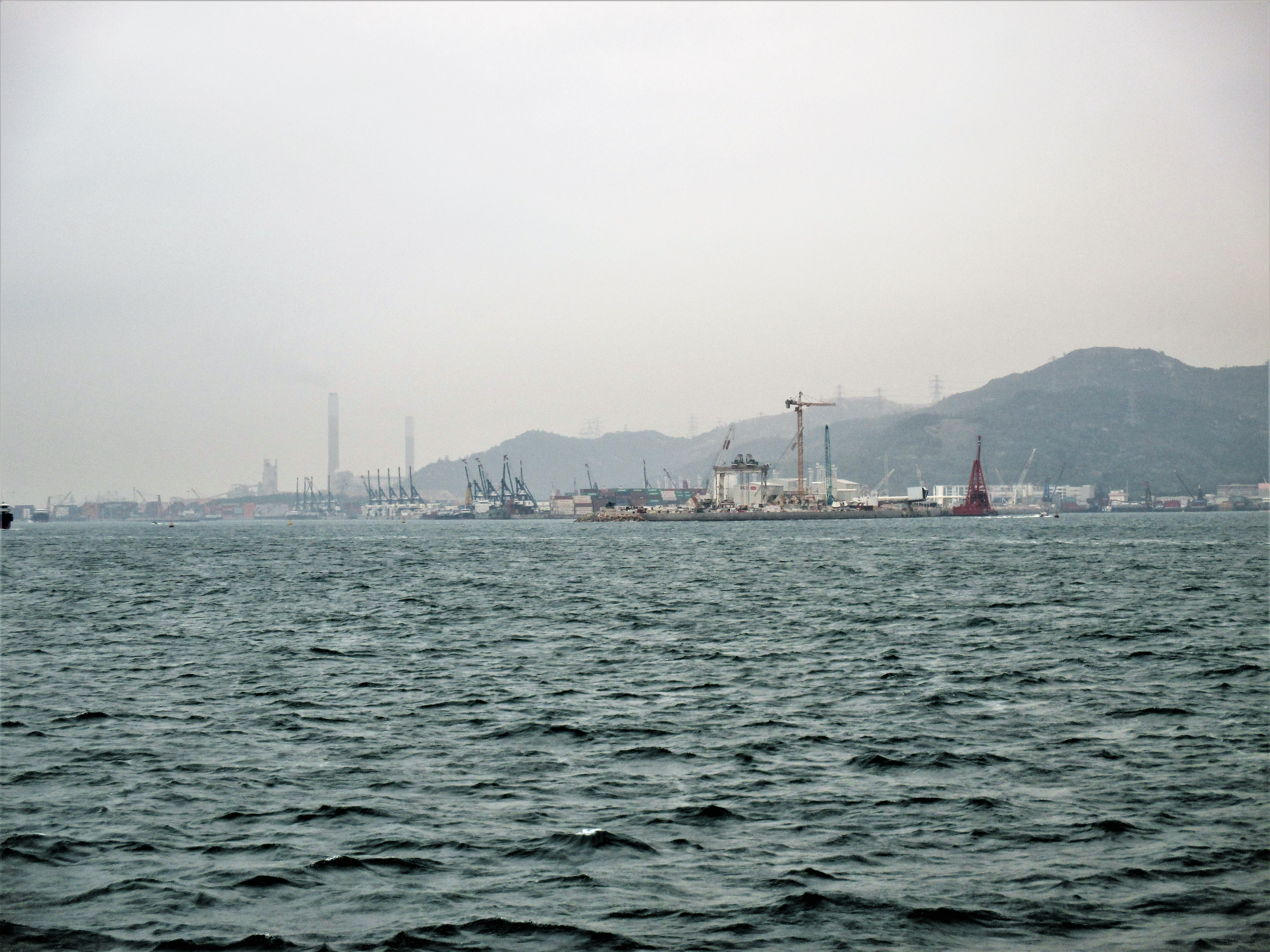
View of the Urmston Road, with construction of the tunnel's northern landfall visible

The contract to construct the Northern Connection tunnel (No. HY/2012/08) was awarded to the Dragages-Bouygues Joint Venture on 26 July 2013. It commenced on 5 August 2013. The contract to construct the southern section was awarded to Gammon Construction in June 2013. The entire project opened to traffic on 27 December 2020.

== Design ==
The tunnel portion is a two-lane dual carriageway approximately 5 kilometres long.

== Construction ==
The dual sub-sea tunnels were bored up to 55 metres below sea level using the Tuen Mun–Chek Lap Kok TBM, the world's largest tunnel boring machine.

Originally scheduled for opening in 2018, completion of the link had been delayed for two years. It opened to traffic on 27 December 2020.
