= American Rental Association =

US nonprofit trade association

ARA – American Rental Association
- Abbreviation: ARA
- Established: 1955; 71 years ago
- Type: nonprofit trade association
- Coordinates: 41°29′9″N 90°29′59″W
- Region served: North America
- Official language: English
- Website: ararental.org

The American Rental Association (ARA) is a nonprofit trade association representing the equipment rental and event rental segments in North America.

== History ==
It was first formed in 1955 by a group of twenty-one rental store operators. At the time, rental stores were a quickly growing industry. The ARA represents over 11,000 member locations in North America.

== Structure ==
ARA, like most trade associations, uses working committees and short term task forces.

== Members ==
General members at ARA are rental companies who focus substantially on the rental of owned assets to consumers in North America.

== Exhibitions ==
The ARA organizes and hosts The ARA Show annually. It is the 63rd largest trade show in the North America and the largest rental trade show in the world.
