= Floor sanding =

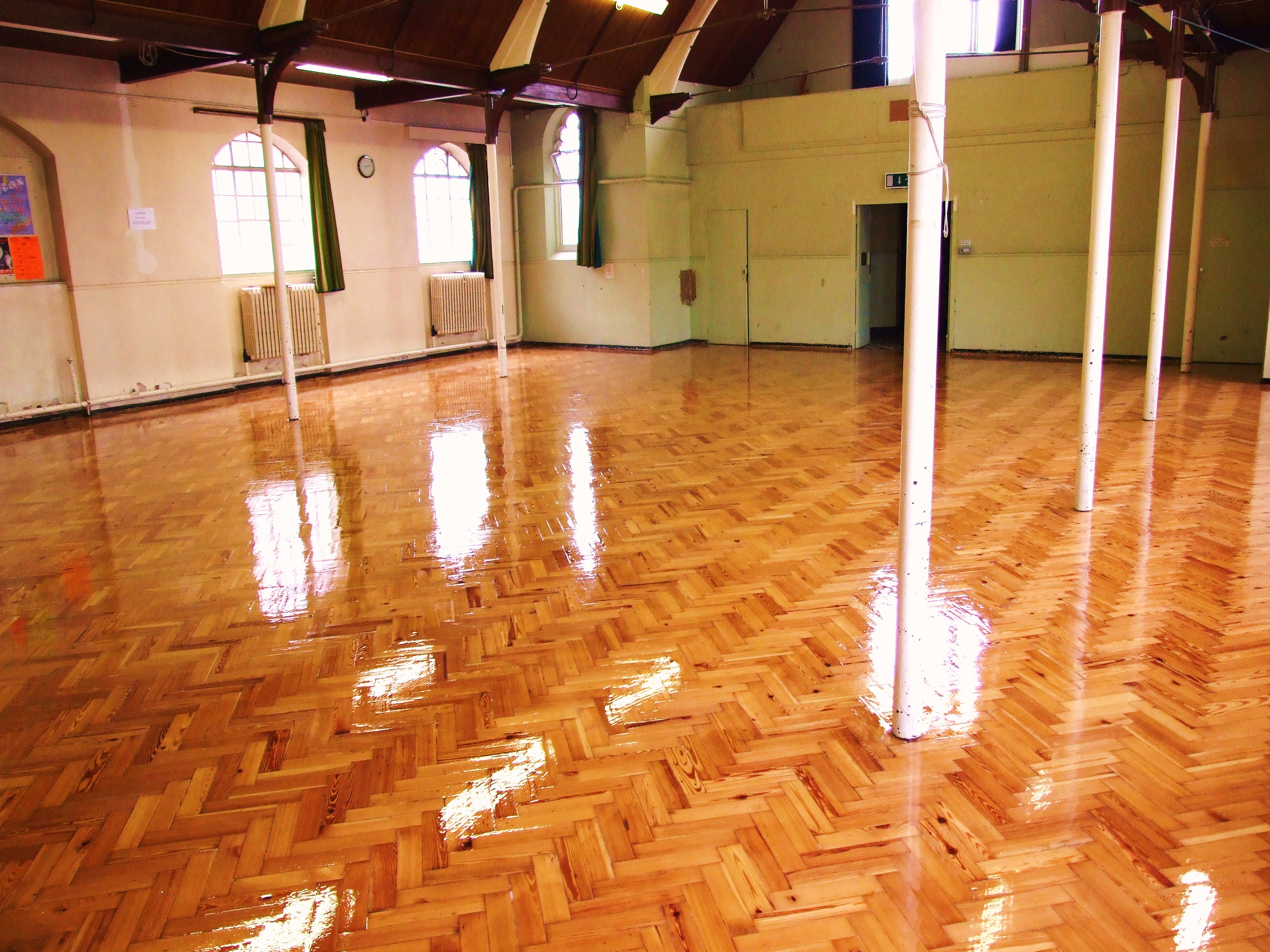
Top coat drying evenly on a large sanded pitch pine floor

Floor sanding is the process of removing the top surfaces of a wooden floor by sanding with abrasive materials.

A variety of floor materials can be sanded, including timber, cork, particleboard, and sometimes parquet. Some floors are laid and designed for sanding. Many old floors are sanded after the previous coverings are removed and suitable wood is found hidden beneath. Floor sanding usually involves three stages: preparation, sanding, and coating with a protective sealant.

== Drum sander machines ==
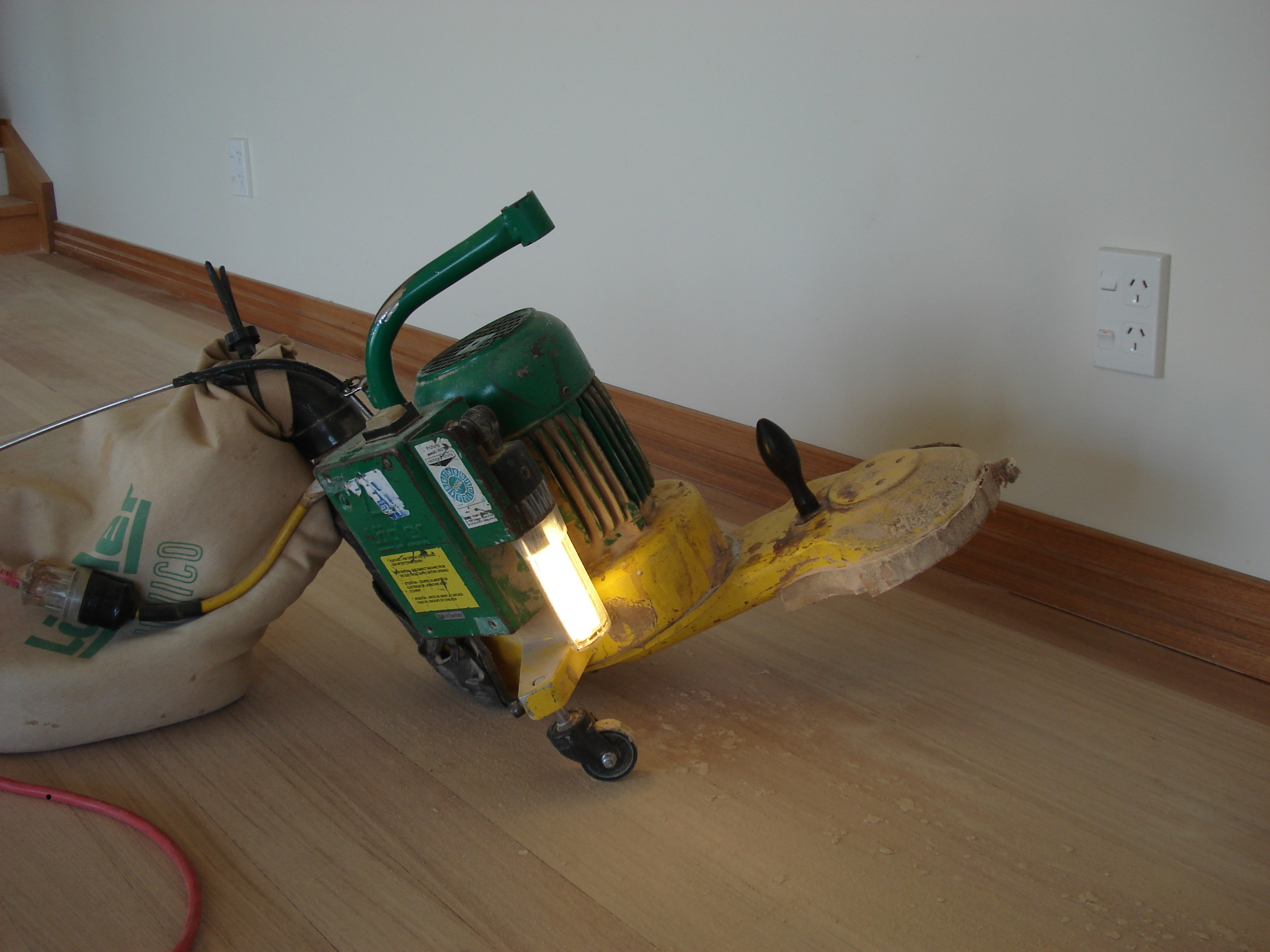
Edger

All modern sanding projects are completed with specialized sanding machines. Drum sander machines come in two versions. There are 120 V and 240 V floor sanders. 240 V drum sanders are more powerful and remove more wood material than the 120 V machine. Most homeowners who want to refinish their floors themselves use the 120 V version as they are more readily available at tool rental stores. Belt sanders are preferred for the continuous sandpaper belt design to prevent sanding machine marks in floors. Feathering is an industry term used by handling the machine in such a way as to avoid deep scratch marks during start and finish. The belt sander was invented by Eugen Laegler in 1969 out of Güglingen, Germany. 90% of the area can be reached with the belt/drum sander. The remaining 10% left such as edges, corners, under cabinets, and stairs, are sanded by an edge sanding machine. A rotary machine known as a multi disc sander or buffer is then used for the final sanding steps. The buffers take abrasive discs, which rotate in same plane is the floor itself. The power of the stripping relies on the weight of the machine and therefore can be useful for surface treatments like buffing, light sanding or stripping old sealants. In the belt sanders the abrasive material is fitted and secured tight between a drum and a tension device. The belt moves vertically, along the grain of the floor surface, which assures a powerful stripping, good finish and a lasting abrasive. In drum sanders it is fitted just around the drum itself, which is less secure and retains a risk of leaving marks on a newly sanded surface.

A buffing machine is used also in the final stages of wood floor refinishing. This is a rotary machine with attached fine abrasives which helps remove differences between the vertical and horizontal circulations of the sanding drums and the disk of the edging machines. These fine abrasives also help to smooth the final finish by removing minor imperfections on the surface prior and between re-coatings.

== Process ==
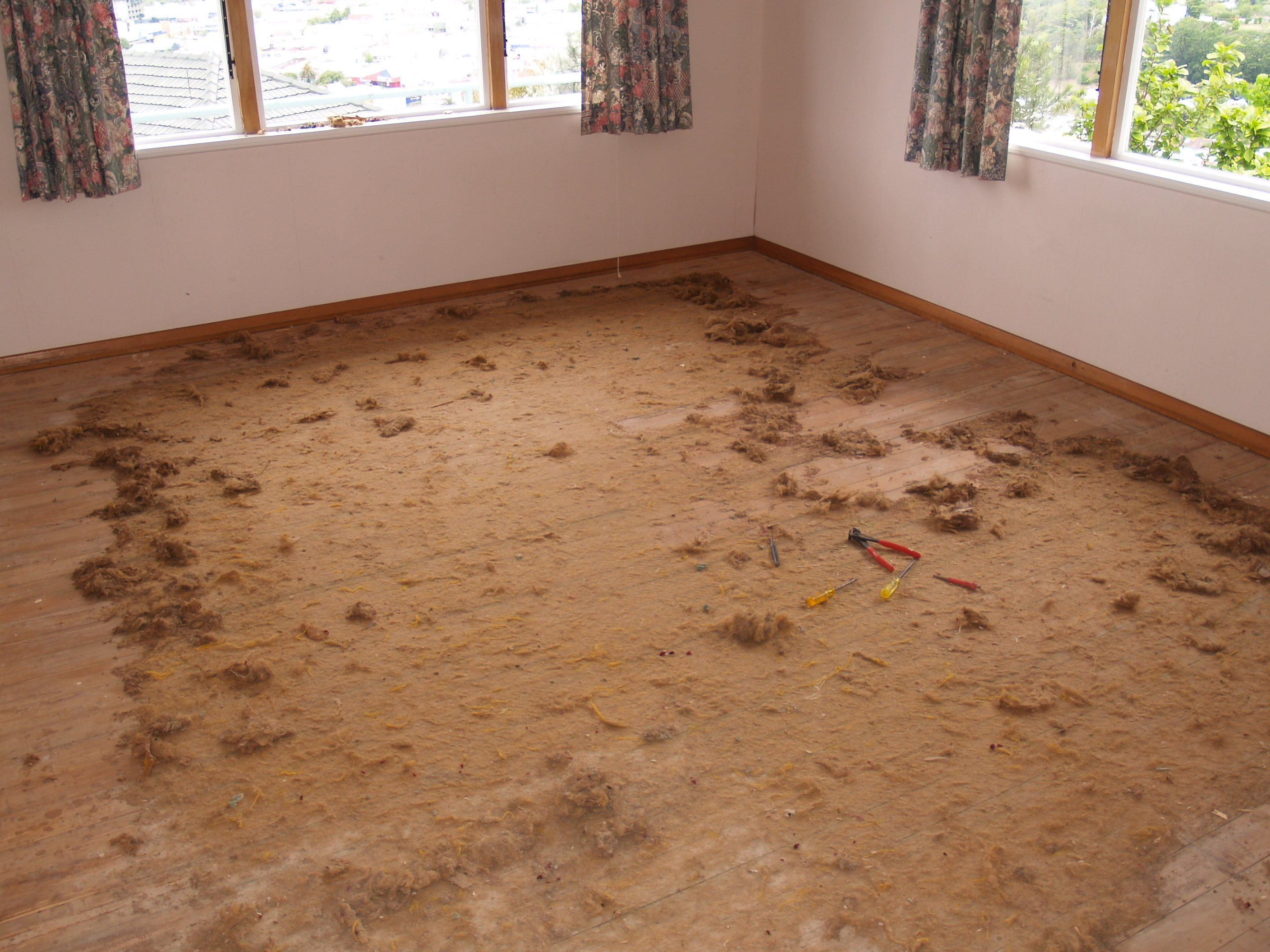
A timber floor after carpet has been pulled. The "fluff" is carpet adhesive.

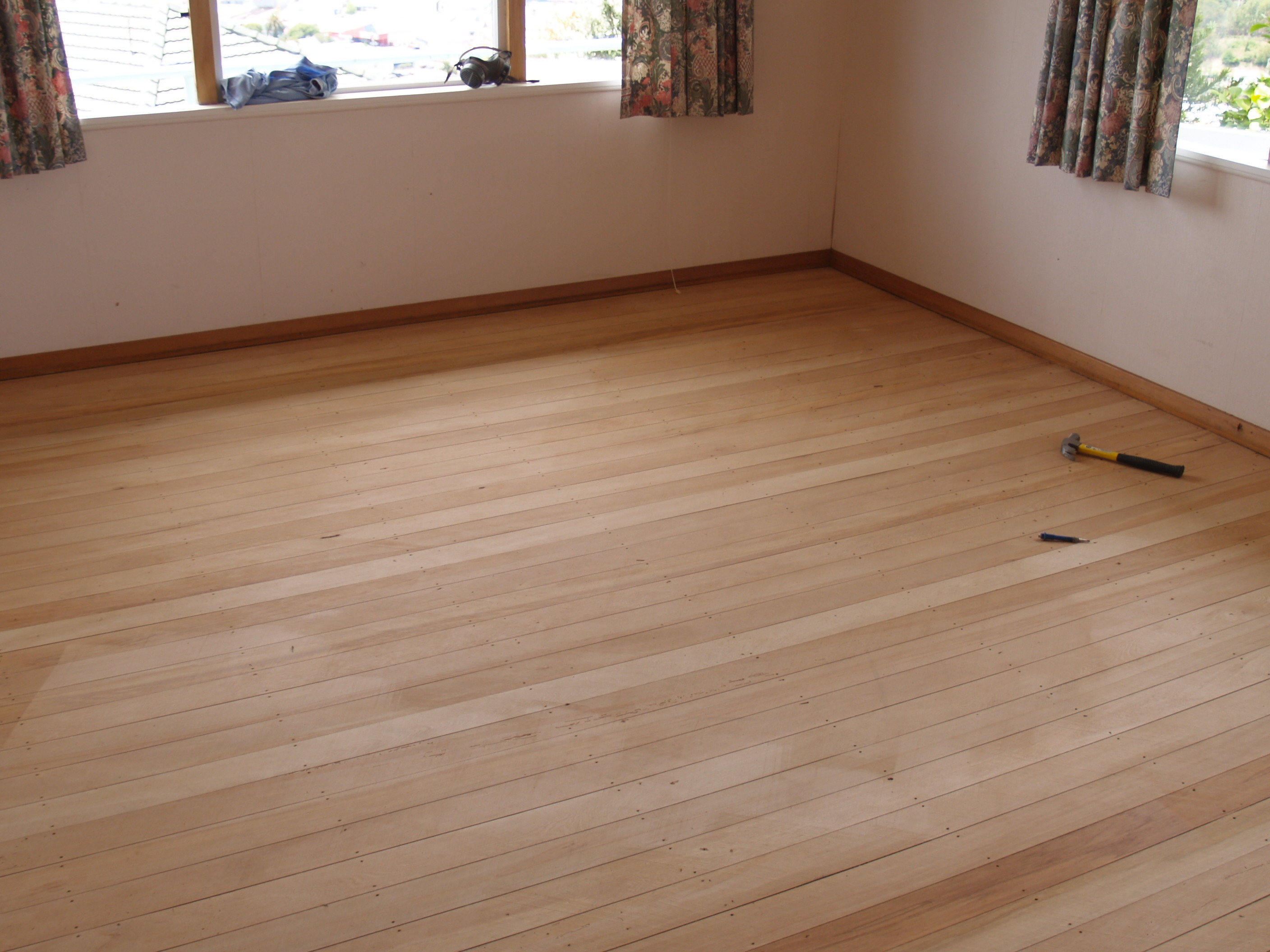
A rimu timber floor after the first cut.

Preparation is the first stage of the wood floor sanding process. All nails which protrude above the boards are punched down. Nails can severely damage the sanding machines which are being used. Staples or tacks used to fasten previous coverings (if any) are removed to reduce the possibility of damage. Some brands or types of adhesives which have been used to secure coverings may need to be removed. Some adhesives, oils, and varnishes, will clog sandpaper and can even make sanding impossible.

After the floor is prepared, the sanding begins. The first cut is done with coarse-grit sandpaper to remove old coatings and to make the floor flat. The best method when using a drum sander is to start out with a lower grit belt sandpaper. For oak, maple, and ash hardwoods, it is recommended to start with 40 grit, then with each subsequent sanding pass, go up in sandpaper grit e.g. 60, 80, and finish with 100 grit. When wood floor planks are warped, cupped, or significantly uneven, it may require multiple passes. The differences in height between the boards are flattened uniformly. The large sanders are used across the grain of the timber. The most common paper used for the first cut is 40 grit. The areas which cannot be reached by the large sanders are sanded by an edger, at the same grit paper as the rest of the floor. If filling of holes or boards is desired this is the stage where this is usually done. 80 grit papers are usually used for the second cut. The belt sander is used inline with the grain of the timber in this cut. A finishing machine is then used to create the final finish. The grit paper used is of personal preference, however 100-150 grit papers are usually used.

The sanded floor is coated with polyurethane, oils, or other sealants. If it is an oil-based sealant, then it is highly poisonous, having a high volatile organic compound content, so wearing a suitable respirator mask is recommended.

== Issues ==
Sanding removes all patina, and can change the character of old floors. The result does not always suit the character of the building.

Sanding old boards sometimes exposes worm-eaten cores, effectively ruining the floor's appearance. This can reduce the sale price, or even cause the floor to require replacement.

Sanding removes material, and timber floors have a limit to how much they can be sanded.

Improper sanding, often caused by using an inferior sanding machine, can lead to 'chatter marks'. These occur when the sander has not been correctly positioned over the area to be sanded, the edge of the sander catches and creates a rippling effect over the wood or parquet floor. Often these marks can only be discerned after the stain or sealant has been applied.
