= Tuen Mun–Chek Lap Kok TBM =

World's largest tunnel boring machine, used for Hong Kong road infrastructure

Mixshield S-880 "Qin Liangyu"
- Classification: Tunnel boring machine
- Application: Tuen Mun–Chek Lap Kok Link
- Dimensions: Length: 120 metres (390 ft); Diameter: 17.6 metres (57.7 ft)
- Weight: 4,850 tonnes (4,770 long tons; 5,350 short tons)
- Launched: 2015
- Cost: US$2.3 billion (2015) (equivalent to US$2.97 billion in 2024) or HK$18.2 billion (2015)
- Builder: Herrenknecht AG

The Tuen Mun–Chek Lap Kok TBM otherwise known as Qin Liangyu or more formally, the Mixshield S-880 was the world's largest tunnel boring machine launched in June 2015 by Herrenknecht in Germany. The TBM was used to drill a 5 km (3.1 mi) tunnel connecting Tuen Mun to the Hong Kong International Airport, part of the Tuen Mun–Chek Lap Kok Link project. The contract for the project was around HK$ 18.2 billion (US$ 2.3 billion)

== Specifications ==
The machine had a diameter of 17.6 metres (57.7 ft), 0.1 metres (0.3 ft) more than Bertha, the previous largest tunnel boring machine. Outside of its cutting diameter, it had an overall length of 120 m (393 ft 8 in) and weighed 4,850 t (4,770 long tons; 5,350 short tons).

== Operations ==
The machine would excavate a 5 km (3.1 mi)-long underwater tunnel, working at pressures as high as 5 bar (500 kPa; 73 psi). The drilling had taken place in depths of up to 50 m (160 ft) below sea level.

By 25 March and 3 November 2015, the TBM's shield was converted into one the much smaller 14 m (46 ft) to complete the rest of the tunnel alongside another Herrenknecht TBM. The two 14-m TBMs broke through to complete the tunnels on 27 February 2019.

The tunnel boring project began in October 2018 after the cutterhead conversion and was completed by the end of 2020. Tuen Mun–Chek Lap Kok was disassembled after the completion of the tunnel.
