= Equipment rental =

Service industry providing temporary tools

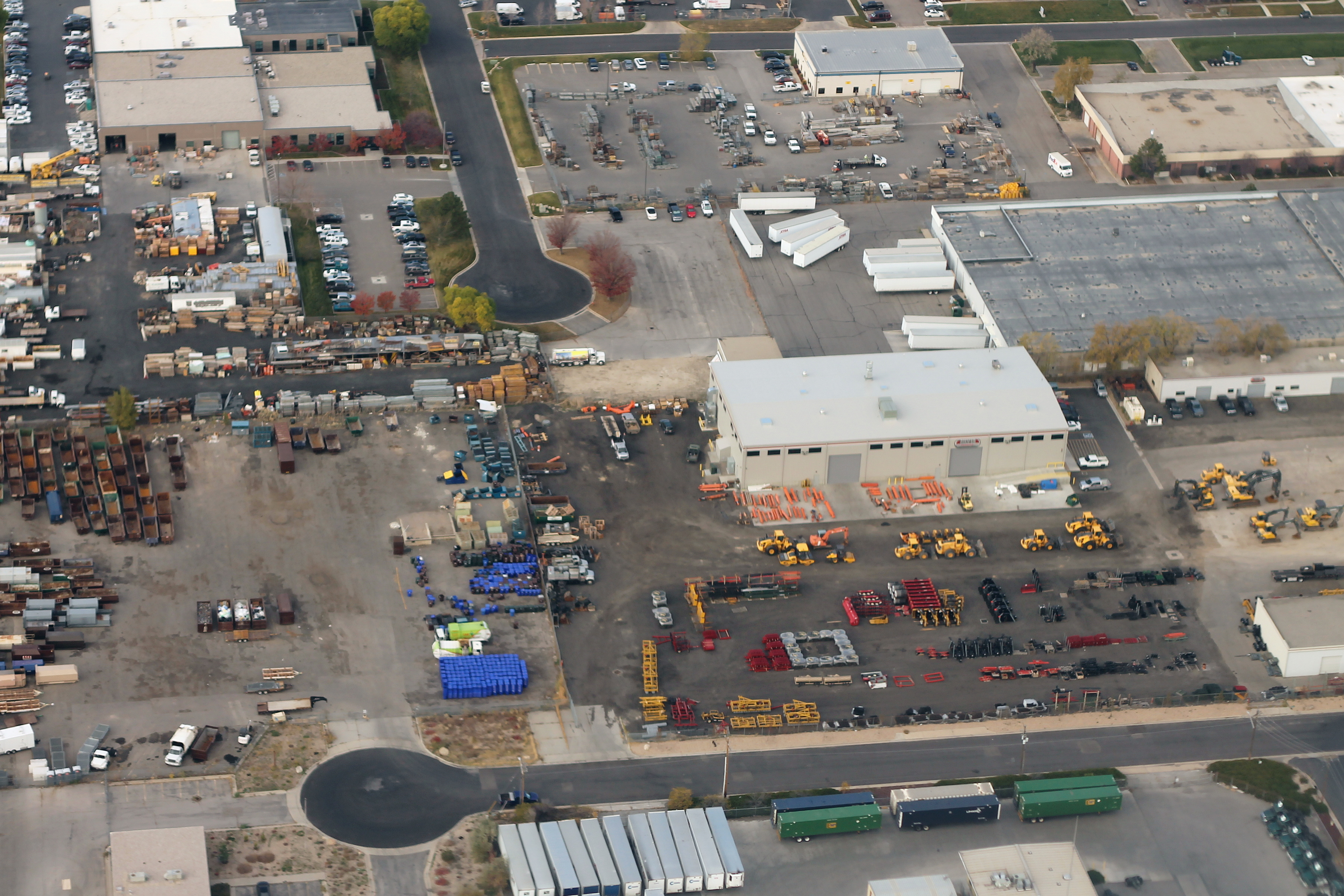
Construction equipment rental in Salt Lake City, Utah

Equipment rental, or plant hire, is a service industry providing machinery, equipment and tools for a limited period of time to final users, mainly to general contractors but also to industry and individual consumers. Renting can be defined as paying someone for the use of something for temporary or short-term purposes.

== History ==
Equipment rental was first developed in Anglo-Saxon countries. It emerged in the UK after the First World War and has now become a multi-billion euro business providing a wide range of construction and industrial equipment for customers globally. The American Rental Association was founded as early as 1955, and the first waves of consolidation took place in the 1970s in North America, leading to the creation of companies with nationwide operations. Consolidation was slow in the 2000s but a buyout joined the two largest North American rental companies: United Rentals and RSC.

Europe is catching up since the 1980s. In Europe alone there are over 17,000 equipment rental companies and the industry is now growing quickly in other areas of the world, including the Middle East, Latin America, and Asia. The industry has moved from mostly family-owned small businesses to the creation of a number of international groups, some of which have an annual turnover over €1 billion. Around 40 of the 100 largest equipment rental companies in the world are European. The majority of companies in the industry still have fewer than 5 employees. Concentration in the industry is expected to renew at a fast pace, following a pause in 2008–2009 as a consequence of the international credit crunch.

The situation of the equipment rental industry in Europe varies from one country to another, with some markets being more mature. Equipment rental penetration is lower in Southern and Eastern Europe and highest in the UK and the Nordic countries. The potential for growth is important in Southern, Central and Eastern Europe, where some countries saw a double-digit growth rate for rental in recent years.

== Equipment rental market - key figures ==
In 2017, the Global Rental Alliance (GRA) estimated the combined rental revenue among the GRA member associations (US, Canada, Europe and UK, Japan, Australia and New Zealand) to be US$91.5 billion for 2015.

=== North America ===
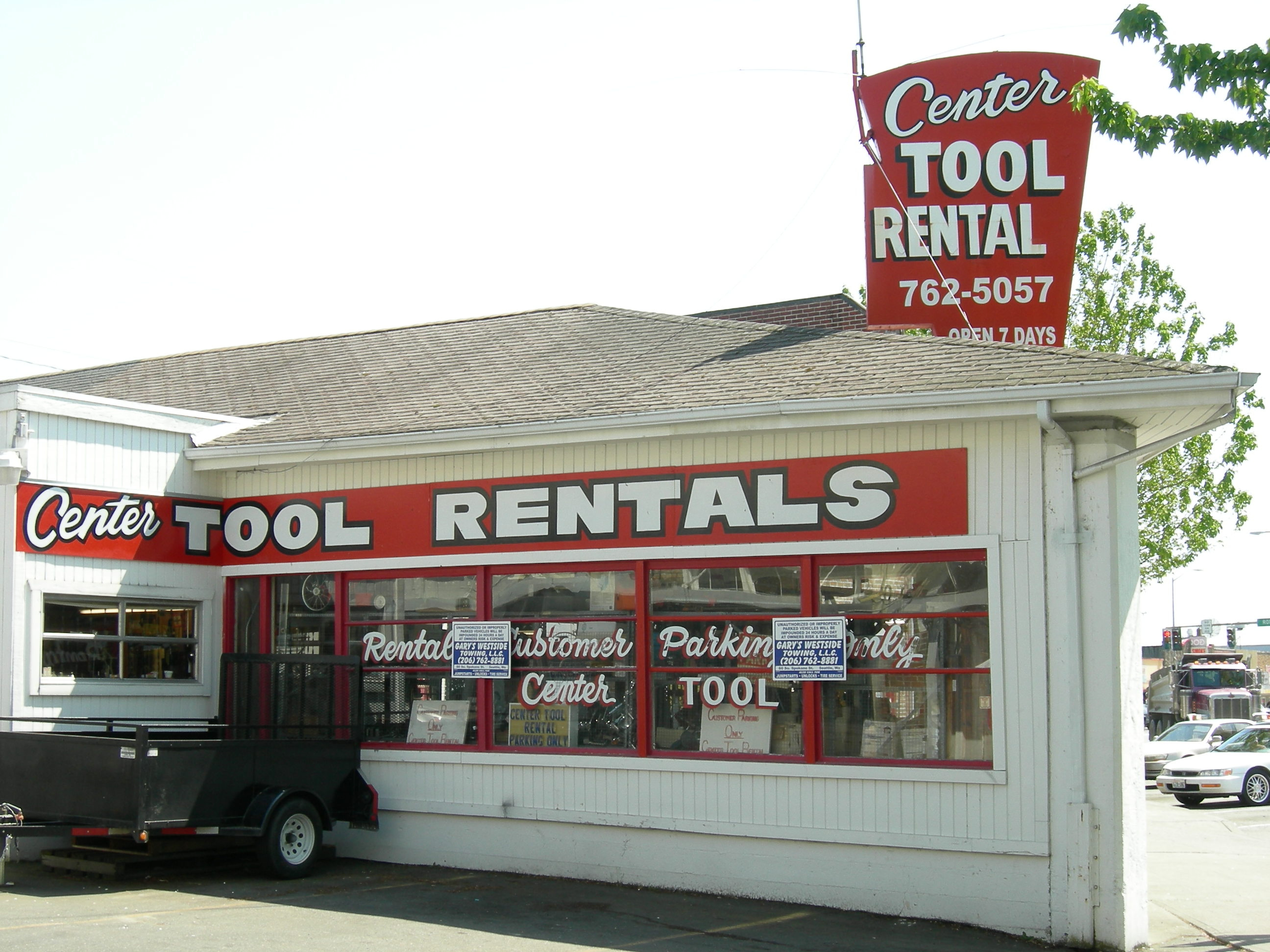
Tool rental shop for consumers

Based on research by the ARA (American Rental Association), rental revenues in 2019 in the U.S were expected to be $55.7 billion, up 5 percent from 2018. Rental revenue in Canada was expected to grow 2.1 percent in 2019 to total nearly $5.5 billion

=== Europe ===
The ERA (European Rental Association) annually publishes the ERA Market Report, based on a research carried out in 15 countries (Austria, Belgium, The Czech Republic, Denmark, Germany, Finland, France, Italy, The Netherlands, Norway, Poland, Spain, Sweden, Switzerland and the UK). In 2019, equipment rental companies and other companies providing rental services generated a total rental turnover of more than EUR 27.7 billion in these countries (EU-EFTA-UK), with the most recent estimates putting the number of rental companies in Europe at 17,280 and people employed in the industry at 133,480.

== Reasons for renting ==
There are several reasons why companies choose to rent equipment instead of buying it: financial and economic, operational and environmental.

=== Financial and economic ===
Equipment rental helps companies reduce their fixed costs and minimizes the financial risks of owning equipment fleets. By renting rather than owning, the user only pays for equipment when it is required thereby avoiding the ongoing costs that come with equipment ownership, including maintenance, in-service inspections, repairs, transportation and storage. Rental allows companies to cope with peak workloads without having to invest in extra equipment. It represents a low-risk way of obtaining equipment when market conditions are uncertain and allows companies to enter new markets or sectors without burdensome investments in machinery – capital that would otherwise be tied up in equipment can be channeled into a company's core business.

The decision to rent over financing or purchasing a piece of equipment is most likely based on a balance of risk and the long term usefulness of the equipment. Renting can be up to three times more expensive over financing, but comes with the benefits of lower risk and commitment better suited to the needs of infrequent or one time users. Buying starts to make more sense when there is a consistent and forecastable use case for the equipment.

Capital Release: In times where they have to demonstrate high levels of profit compared to Invested Capital, contractors are increasingly eager to rent equipment, as it allows them to minimize the size of their equipment fleet. Less immobilized capital allows for improved cost control, lower maintenance costs, and a reduction in transport fleets. Renting equipment with operators allows for optimizing staff costs.

The ERA Total Cost of Ownership calculator can help in deciding whether to buy, rent or lease equipment from financial perspective.

=== Operational ===
Range of recent equipment available: Some rental companies have huge inventories, maintaining a large number and variety of pieces of equipment, while others specialise in a few specific products.

Maintenance, compliance with standards and regulations: Rental companies bear the responsibility for ensuring the equipment they rent out complies with applicable regulations, performing safety check before delivery. Routine maintenance and major repairs are typically handled by the rental company, saving the renter the expense of having a maintenance crew on staff. Safety checks are performed before each delivery.

Outsourcing risk: The rental company is responsible for providing safe equipment on-site and shoulders any risk connected to the transportation of equipment (when this is carried out by the rental company).

Procurement of equipment by a contractor: Sourcing the right equipment, negotiating with suppliers, and ensuring that the most modern and productive equipment is operated.

Flexibility: Rental companies give operational flexibility as well, with the option to rent equipment over the short, medium or long-term.

=== Environmental ===
Renting by definition operates in a circular business model and seen as part of the sharing economy and circular economy, it can contribute to environmental and societal sustainability. The European rental industry, through its representative association ERA, has published a Manifesto for the Promotion of the sustainable benefits of the rental concept.

The Manifesto defines how principles of the circular economy are applied in the rental business:

- Shared usage:
  - The construction companies can access equipment when required,
  - The centralized ownership leads to a more frequent hence more efficient use of equipment.
- Reparability:
  - The rental companies contribute to a product design facilitating maintenance and repair activities,
  - The rental companies focus on spare parts management,
  - The rental companies ask for increased information on product repair from the equipment manufacturers.
- Resource use:
  - Rental companies search for equipment to offer the most sustainable option to their customers.
  - Rental companies provide theoretical and practical trainings to their customers to optimize the use of equipment.
- Reusability:
  - Components of the dismantled construction equipment can be reused.
- Recyclability:
  - Rental companies take care of their equipment by:
  - Repairing when it is still possible,
  - Recycling when it is at the end of its life cycle,
  - Selling it to second hand markets, if it complies with regulations.
  - Rental companies use their bargaining power to demand equipment suppliers to invest more in R&D to limit the use of non-recyclable material, and take responsibility for end-of-life of equipment by collecting, reusing or recycling.

==== Carbon footprint of construction equipment ====
An independent research study on the carbon footprint of construction equipment has demonstrated that the rental business model stimulates the efficient use of equipment and that this efficient use lowers the total carbon footprint. Depending on specific user practice, this can lead to significant reductions, in the range of 30%.

The researchers of the study built a calculator to determine the carbon footprint of the use of construction equipment, based on various parameters. The parameters with the biggest influence on the carbon footprint of equipment are:

- Intensity of use - maximizing the utilisation rate could reduce the amount of equipment required
- Using the right equipment for the job
- Transportation - shorter distances to a jobsite and higher load factors of the vehicles transporting the equipment
- Maintenance - allowing extended lifetime

ERA used this study to develop a free online tool to determine exact carbon footprint of construction equipment per hour of use of the equipment. The ERA Equipment CO_{2} calculator.

== What can be rented ==
The equipment rental market goes well beyond construction machinery and can include rental equipment such as a dedicated server housed in a data center. In addition to the construction sector, the rental market supplies a wide range of customers and industries, including gardening and landscaping, municipal and forestry services, the event industry [like PA equipment, LED screens, Camera/videography equipment, etc], IT infrastructure, and private clients. Depending on the customer segment, specialized machinery and equipment are available. Furthermore, the equipment on rental offer is often complemented by additional services. A brief overview of the different categories of equipment that can be rented is detailed below.

=== Construction machines and equipment ===
Construction machines on offer for rental range from small machines, such as mini-excavators and skid steer loaders, to heavy equipment, including hydraulic excavators and dumpers, which some rental companies offer with trained operators. When contractors need specialized equipment that they do not hold in their own fleet, renting is often preferred. This can include equipment such as machines for road or railway construction and forestry or agricultural work. Customers can also rent a wide range of commonly used construction equipment, such as compressors, pumps and compaction machines, or even small machines.

=== Power and temperature control ===
Rental companies offer a wide range of temporary power solutions, whether for site use, events, petrochemical applications, manufacturing needs, shutdowns or power failures. The product range available includes generators, load banks, transformers and mobile fuel tanks. Various climate control solutions, such as heating and cooling systems and heat exchangers, as well as a variety of lighting systems, are also available.

=== Powered access, forklifts and telehandlers ===
Powered access is an important sector in the rental market. For different works at great height, for example for roof or hall construction, industrial cleaning or installation works, customers can choose from a wide range of working platforms or building construction lifts. Furthermore, telehandlers can be rented for diverse transportation tasks on construction sites. The industrial and event sectors often demand efficient logistics, and a range of forklifts are available.

=== Modular and sanitary space ===
Modular space is an effective means of providing additional space on a customer's site, for short-term as well as long-term projects. The containers can be combined to build site offices and accommodation, sanitary facilities or storage space. In addition, a wide range of interior equipment or furnishings is available. Some rental companies offer special rental services for modular space, including preparing outlines and foundation plans, transport and installation services.

=== Traffic safety ===
Safety is a critical issue on every construction site, especially when construction works are carried out along busy roads or on highways. Therefore, rental companies offer various professional solutions for traffic safety. This is not limited to the provision and installation of beacons or traffic signs. As specific traffic safety regulations may apply depending on the country or region in which the construction site is located, traffic safety requires an enormous planning effort and the know-how of well-trained professionals. Thus, some rental companies have extended their rental services in this area and take care of the whole planning process, including obtaining official approval or preparing traffic regulation plans.

=== Falsework, formwork and groundworks ===
Some rental companies offer a range of temporary construction solutions, such as formwork, panels used to hold concrete in place until it sets, and falsework, which is propping to hold a concrete structure until it sets. Groundworks may also be included in the product range. That is, equipment designed to hold holes in the ground open and allow operatives to work safely.

=== Smaller equipment and Tools ===
Whether for woodwork, metalwork, construction or do-it-yourself projects, an extensive inventory of well-maintained smaller equipment and hand/power tools is available to tackle any job size or surface type. Smaller equipment can range from portable generators, concrete mixers and fan heaters to LED stand lights, wallpaper stripper and floor sanders. Tools can include power drills, power saws, electric rotary hammers, rock splitters and breakers, and portable cut-off saws.

== Who to rent from and how ==
The choice of a rental company is dependent on the nature of the product to be rented, the company profile, the profile of the customer and the type of equipment needed. Here are some key criteria:

=== Definition of equipment needs ===
For specific equipment, it is useful to establish relationships with rental depots that have experience with the products required. If the customer knows what task they need the equipment for, the rental company will identify the best equipment for the job. Besides equipment, it is important to define which accessories are required. Rental depots usually have a full range of accessories. If the only item required is an accessory, the widest range will be found with the specialists in the sector.

=== Location of the branch(s) or depot(s) ===
The proximity of the rental depot provides economic and sustainability benefits because it reduces transport costs and the environmental footprint. When renting small equipment, the economic aspect is among the most decisive factors in the choice of a rental company. With larger equipment, the transportation cost and environmental impact becomes more important.

=== Fleet inventory ===
The fleet inventory should guarantee the immediate availability of the equipment required, especially when the equipment is booked in advance. Dealing with a large depot allows customers to find, from a single source, the full range of services required during the contractual period. Especially in the initial phase of the relationship, it is important to talk personally with the depot manager and check the fleet. Rental depots must provide equipment that is fully compliant with legislative regulations and in good operating condition. Many rental companies rent equipment fitted with telematics solutions (especially large equipment). This enables the tracking of equipment, a detailed analysis of the way it is being used and a reduction of the maintenance costs, among other benefits. All rented equipment must be compliant with existing legislation on safety.

=== Rental rates and conditions ===
Rental rates is the easiest parameter to compare. Special offers for weekend or long-term rentals can make a rental depot more attractive. Together with rental rates, it is important to assess the full range of services included in an offer, as well as the specifications of the equipment provided, which may be more or less expensive to run. Some rental companies may be more competitive in short-term rentals and others in long-term rentals. It is, therefore, necessary to compare individual fees precisely and thoroughly. Rental conditions lay out the policies applied by the rental depot and provide all the information regarding the services ancillary to rental that are included in the rental rates and those that are excluded. Some of the services / issues rental conditions should address include:

- Transportation of the equipment (generally excluded from the rental fee);
- Damage waiver coverage (ranging from no coverage to full coverage);
- Responsibility for maintenance (which tasks are performed by the rental company and which are the responsibility of the customer);
- Rules applying to downtime.

Rental depots should also guarantee continuity of service through the replacement of the equipment or through assistance services.

=== Length of rental period ===
For long-term rentals, the focus should be on rental depots offering attractive conditions. In the case of a short-term rental, the best rental fees should be searched for from depots offering flexible contractual conditions.

=== Who will use the equipment ===
Rental depots offering equipment with standard instructions for use should be the preferred choice. Rental depots should have well-trained staff who are able to explain the practical and safe use of the equipment and provide answers to technical questions.

=== Sustainability ===
An increasing number of rental companies have stringent procedures in place with regard, for example, to waste management, energy saving, environmentally adapted fuels and oils, and reduction of chemicals. They usually publish their own Corporate social responsibility (CSR) policies on their website. These relate to all aspects of sustainability (economic, social and environmental).

=== Rental platforms / marketplaces ===
In recent years, new players have appeared in the equipment rental market, namely online platforms. These companies offer digital solutions to the rental needs of customers, acting as an intermediary between customers and rental companies:

The customer sends an inquiry to the platform, the platform checks the availability of the machine in its network and the customer receives an offer, either from the platform or from a rental company. Whether it is a good idea to rent equipment via a rental platform depends on the type of equipment requested, on the customer's knowledge of the machine and on the location of the job site.

On the one hand, rental platforms offer fast price comparisons, but on the other hand, they do not show the full spectrum of services offered by different rental companies that accompany the requested equipment.

== See also ==
- Renting
- Operated equipment rental
- Equipment service management and rental
