= Equipment service management and rental =

Equipment service management and rental (ESM&R) refers to equipment services management throughout the heavy equipment life cycle. Increased competition and slim margins in heavy equipment sales and rental place a heavy burden on manufacturers, dealers, rental companies and service businesses to improve their service performance. Improving service in these conditions is critical to maintaining margins and growing profitability.

The ESM&R approach provides an integrated view of the heavy equipment business. Thus manufacturers, dealers, suppliers, rental and services business can improve the value their customers derive from their equipment and subsequently improve their own profitability and reduce cost at the same time. Collaboration is a critical factor in the equipment supply chain.

Equipment companies must have two fundamentals in place of operational control of service operations on the one hand and equipment intelligence on the other. (1) This enables companies to move to proactive service approaches and make better business decisions. To instill these two fundamentals, service organizations are adopting equipment service management processes and tools.

== Heavy equipment life-cycle ==
The ESM&R approach directly links to the concept of the equipment life-cycle which demands continuous control and a historical record – from the initial forecasting and sale of the equipment, through to shipping, renting, servicing, overhaul and final disposal. Thus heavy equipment, just like any product life-cycle has its own life-cycle. The main stages of the heavy equipment life-cycle are:

Phase	Challenges in each phase
Introduction	Design & manufacturing
Growth	Support, warranties, customer agreement terms, service details, meter information and error symptoms, optimizing stock levels, maintain peak equipment intelligence.
Maturity	Use all the data that has been accumulating over time related to profitability, service history, maintenance details, warranty issues and more.
Decline	Use all of the data and statistics that have been maintained throughout the equipment life’s journey. These records along with direct feedback from the field can be extremely valuable for new product development and the fine-tuning of future designs.
