= Operated equipment rental =

Operated Equipment Rental is the term used for the rental of large or complex machinery where the rental company supplies an operator or driver to operate the machinery. This is also sometimes referred to as Wet Rental (particularly in Australia), and Operated Plant (in the UK). In India, the Middle East and Asia a large percentage of all heavy equipment and cranes are supplied with operator reflecting the comparative youth of training programs for specialized operators in construction companies in those countries.

== Differences from other forms of rental ==
- In this specialized market the rental charges to the customer are not purely based on the rental of the machine, but on the combined value of the machine and timesheets entered by the operator whilst working for the renter.
- Additional charges are generally included within the contract for elements such as travel time, lunch breaks, overtime and additional installation or ground services such as Slingers, Riggers and other specialized jobs.
- Many larger rental companies also provide training services for customer's own employees to be trained to comparable standards with the rental operators so that equipment can be supplied without operators (also known as Dry Rental).
- In the UK Crane Rental industry in the UK, which is one of the most highly developed crane rental industries in the world, special regulations for health and safety and rental procedures are in place. These are maintained as the CPA regulations.
- In Europe, European Rental Association is the trade body representing the equipment rental industry.
