= Hydraulic splitter =

Portable hydraulic tool for breaking rocks

A hydraulic splitter (also called as rock splitter or darda splitter) is a portable hydraulic tool used for controlled breaking of rock, concrete, or other hard materials. Commonly used in demolition, construction, mining, and quarrying operations where precision, low vibration, or noise reduction is required, they are preferred over explosive methods in sensitive environments, including confined underground workings and environments where vibration or explosive use must be minimized.

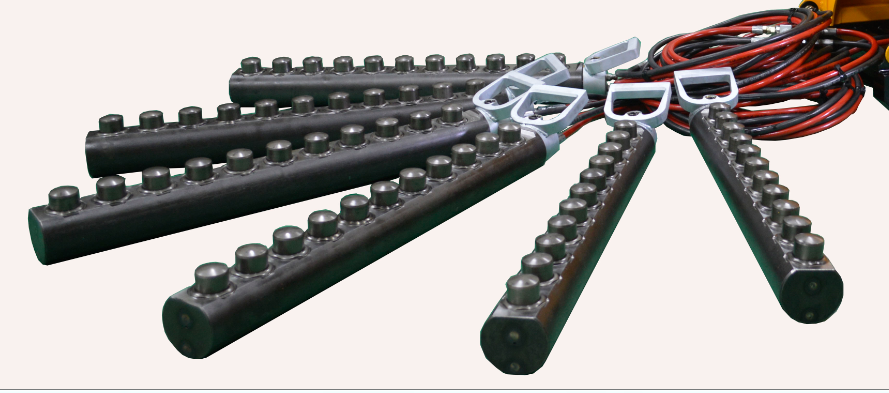
Piston splitters with 85 mm (3.3 in) diameter cylinders

The device is typically inserted into a pre-drilled borehole, where hydraulic pressure drives wedges outward to induce tensile fractures in the surrounding rock. Effectiveness depends on drilling layout and the presence of a free face, which allows fractured rock to detach.
