= Mobile asset management =

Mobile inventory system

Mobile asset management is managing availability and serviceability of assets used to move, store, secure, protect and control inventory within the enterprise and along the supply chain or in conjunction with service providing.

Mobile assets are e.g. of the classes of

- returnable, reusable containers used to transport raw materials, work-in-progress and finished goods through the supply chain.
- precious tools and apparatuses used in technical services and required for proper performing such services with fully valid certification
- any other objects of a value that justifies additional tagging for the purpose of managing the object and its availability
- any other objects with a certification that terminates after certain time which justifies the controlled return for next inspection
- persons under special threat on site of operation.
- Rental companies are increasingly turning to asset tracking for all larger pieces of equipment in order to manage theft, misuse of assets and to assist in the management of Preventive maintenance

== Tracking mobile assets ==
The business justification to invest in asset tracking capability is usually the risk of loss. This can be loss of the asset directly, or loss of the ability to render service to customers that is enabled by the asset. For example, the business may have a few critical tools, and the loss of just one of these tools would significantly degrade the ability to perform necessary work.

Thus, the assets being tracked may a) have specific quantifiable capital value or b) general aggregate operational value.

Examples for such assets include

- beer kegs,
- intermediate bulk containers (IBCs) used in the food and chemical industries,
- racks for glass and automotive parts,
- unit load devices (ULDs) used in the airline industry.
- Line-replaceable unit LRUs of in-field operational installations
- rolling cages,
- collapsible aluminum containers for raw materials,
- portable surgical instruments
- medical devices in hospitals and subject of repetitive certification.

=== Non-Asset Mobile Tracking Applications ===
Persons may be tracked within a controlled geographical area; e.g. hospital patients, visitors in a secure facility, or workers in power plants, chemical plants, or tunnel construction sites. People can be actively tracked to locate them reliably and quickly in the unfortunate case of disaster. Person-tracking is a highly specialized application that requires special-purpose technology, and is only workable within a specific, controlled environment. Tracking an individual person in an open, uncontrolled environment without special instrumentation is not realistically possible.

=== Concerns with usage of tracking mobile assets ===
These assets are often in the hands of third party entities (such as suppliers, customers, logistics providers and carriers) and out of sight and control of the owning entity. They usually represent a significant capital expenditure for companies and their management and maintenance is resource-intensive.

On average, businesses spend 5% of annual revenue on logistics assets, and almost one-fifth of respondents spend more than 10%. The annual costs include the replacement of lost or damaged special containers, where typically up to 30% of the containers are surplus in circulation just because nobody knows when and where.

=== Outsourcing mobile asset management ===
Mobile asset management providers manage asset operation within the supply chain, directing the activities of a client's third party logistics company as needed and ensure proper services are performed on the asset (handling, cleaning, maintenance, repair). These providers also study business processes within the supply chain and help optimize each process.

== Methods of tracking ==
Different methods exist to track and manage mobile assets. Today, companies use labor-intensive manual processes to track assets between manufacturers and distributors, which can result in higher supply chain costs and processes that are less reliable due to natural human error. Specific identification of the container's origin and destination is virtually impossible under this method.

=== Components of mobile asset management ===
Mobile asset management solutions can include one or more of these parts:

- Server unit
- Database unit
- Wireless tags for the units
- Illumination bases for wireless communications (GSM)
- Locating receivers (GPS)

=== Asset tracking technology ===
More sophisticated mobile asset management companies use the most advanced means of tracking assets available today, such as radio-frequency identification. RFID automatically captures data on each individual container and can indicate container contents without ever having to open the container. This technology is also combined with software applications that collect, maintain, track and analyze the data and provide customized reporting of the location, status, and audit and maintenance history of each asset. For example, Wayne Memorial hospital has saved $300,000 by tracking for infusion pumps with RFID technology that can piggyback on the Wi-Fi system already in place. That system is known as "Active" RFID because it uses tags that have batteries and constantly beacon. The most popular form of Asset Tracking using RFID is "passive" RFID using ISO Standard 18000-6c. The Financial Services Technology Consortium created a standard for tracking assets at bank locations see www.FSTC.org. The company that performed the work for FSTC and most of the member banks is ODIN and they have a specialty RFID Asset Tracking Software.

=== Flexible pricing options ===
Management providers typically offer flexible financing options, including pay-per-use, subscription or leasing models. Each financing option provides a predictable monthly asset-related expense.

== Benefits of mobile asset management ==
The major benefits of mobile asset management include:

- Improve visibility of assets in the supply chain
- Meet compliance mandates of customers
- Improve asset tracking and inventory control across multiple facilities
- Reduce loss or damage of goods while in transit
- Streamline business processes having to do with assets
- Reduced labor cost and human error with automatic asset tracking technology
- Reductions in theft and improvements in rental utilization

== See also ==
- Track and trace
