= Sharp Street East, Hong Kong =

Street in Causeway Bay, Hong Kong

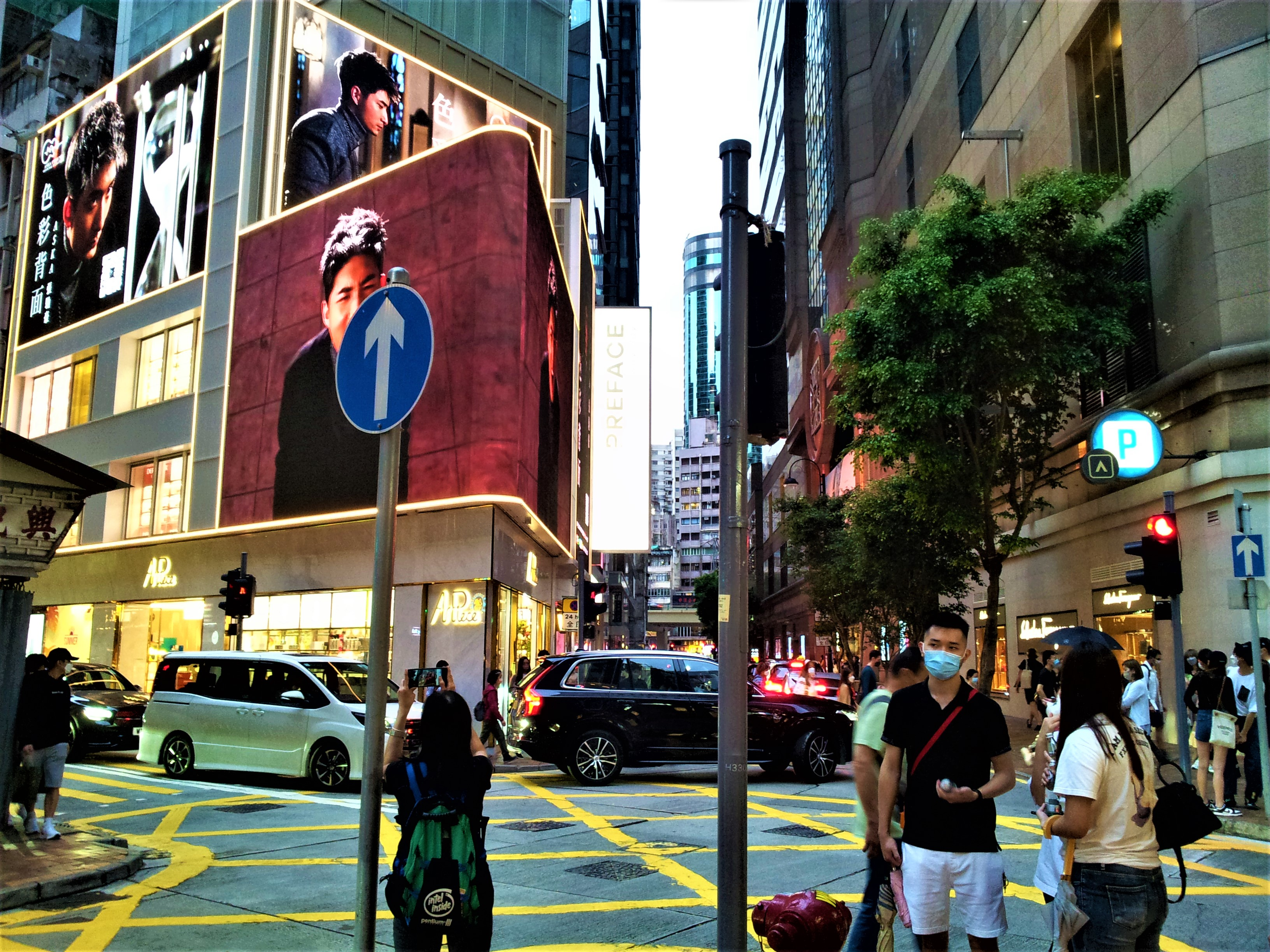
Sharp Street East

Sharp Street East (Chinese: 霎東街) is a street in Causeway Bay, Wan Chai District, Hong Kong Island. It starts from Percival Street near Leighton Road in the east, passes Lee Theatre Plaza, the intersection of Matheson Street (勿地臣街), Times Square, and Holiday Inn Express Hong Kong Causeway Bay, and connects to Canal Road East near the exit of Canal Road flyover in the west.

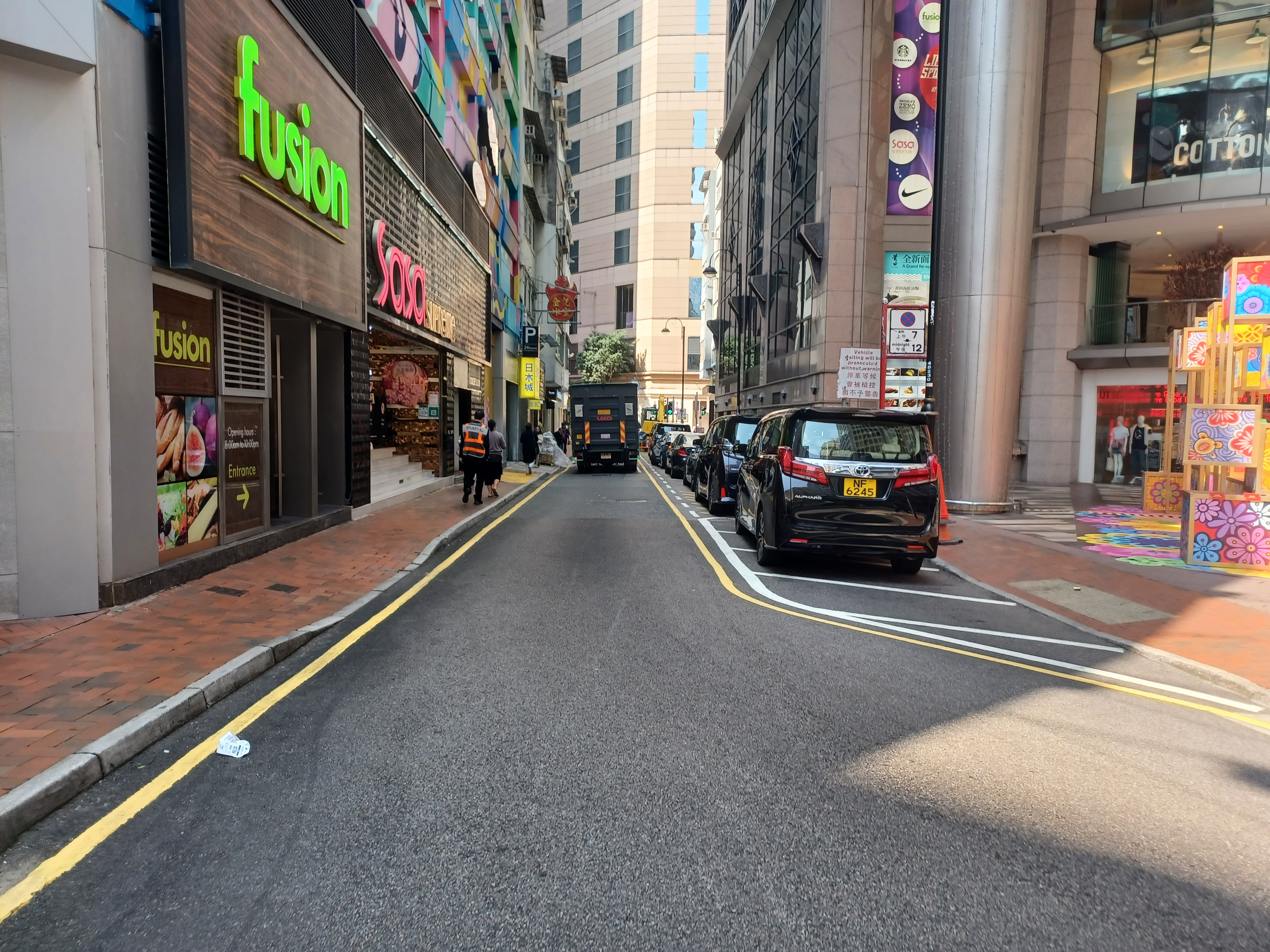
Junction of Sharp Street East and Percival Street

To the west of Sharp Street East there is a street called Sharp Street West.

== History ==
The earliest tram depot was located in the area of Bowrington Road (寶靈頓道) and Canal Road. It was not until the 1920s that a large depot was built on Russell Street in Causeway Bay. It was named Russell Street Depot and was used for parking and repairing trams. In the 1930s, the number of trams continued to increase and the Russell Street Depot was no longer sufficient. In 1938, the tram company opened the King's Road Depot on King's Road in North Point. In the 1950s, in order to unify operations and centralize maintenance, the tram company decided to expand the Russell Street Depot (羅素街車廠). The project was completed in 1953, and the Russell Street Depot was renamed Sharp Street Depot (霎東街車廠), also known as Causeway Bay Depot (銅鑼灣車廠). As the depot is quite close to nearby residential areas, the noise generated by the trams returning to the depot causes considerable disturbance to the residents, especially in the early hours of the morning. Finally, on March 30, 1989, the Sha Tung Street Depot was officially moved to the Whitley Street Depot and Sai Wan Ho Tramway Depot, and the original site was converted into the familiar Times Square.

In order to ease traffic congestion, the Hong Kong Transport Department changed Sharp Street East near the junction of Sharp Street East and Canal Road East from one-way into a two-way in June 2018.
