= Wharf Real Estate Investment Company =

Hong Kong real estate portfolio company

Wharf Real Estate Investment Company Limited
- Trade name: Wharf REIC
- Company type: Listed
- Traded as: SEHK: 1997; Hang Seng Index component
- ISIN: KYG9593A1040
- Industry: real estate investment; transportation
- Founded: 2017
- Founder: The Wharf (Holdings)
Headquarters
Hong Kong, China	(de facto)
Grand Cayman, Cayman Islands	(registered office)
- Area served: Hong Kong; Singapore
- Key people: Stephen Ng (Chairman & Managing Director)
- Products: Commercial rental floor
- Services: intra-city ferry service
- Revenue: ▼HK$16,043 million (2019)
- Net income: ▼HK$3,928 million (2019)
- Total assets: ▲HK$284,341 million (2019)
- Total equity: ▼HK$216,164 million (2019)
- Owner: Wheelock & Co. (66.01%)
- Parent: Wheelock & Co.
Subsidiaries
Wharf Estates	(100%)
Wharf Estates Singapore	(100%)
Harbour Centre Development	(72%)
Star Ferry	(100%)
etc.

Chinese name
- Traditional Chinese: 九龍倉置業地產投資有限公司
- Simplified Chinese: 九龙仓置业地产投资有限公司
Transcriptions
Standard Mandarin
- Hanyu Pinyin: Jiǔlóng cāng zhìyè dìchǎn tóuzī yǒuxiàn gōngsī
Yue: Cantonese
- Yale Romanization: gáu lùhng chōng ji yihp deih cháan tàuh jī yáuh haahn gūng sī
- Jyutping: gau2 lung4 cong1 zi3 jip6 dei6 caan2 tau4 zi1 jau5 haan6 gung1 si1

short name
- Traditional Chinese: 九龍倉置業
- Simplified Chinese: 九龙仓置业
Transcriptions
Standard Mandarin
- Hanyu Pinyin: Jiǔlóng cāng zhìyè
Yue: Cantonese
- Yale Romanization: gáu lùhng chōng ji yihp
- Jyutping: gau2 lung4 cong1 zi3 jip6
- Website: www.wharfreic.com
- Footnotes / references source

Wharf Real Estate Investment Company Limited (Wharf REIC) is a listed real estate portfolio company. It is a subsidiary of private company Wheelock & Co. (formerly listed), as well as a sister company of fellow listed company The Wharf (Holdings).

Wharf REIC owned a few shopping centres and commercial buildings in Hong Kong (via Wharf Estates Limited and other subsidiaries such as listed company Harbour Centre Development) and in Singapore (via Wharf Estates Singapore and subsidiaries), namely: Harbour City complex, Times Square, Wheelock House, Crawford House, The Murray, Plaza Hollywood, Wheelock Place, Scotts Square etc.

== History ==
Wharf Real Estate Investment Company Limited (Wharf REIC) was formed as a spin-off of The Wharf (Holdings) in 2017. Before the spin off, in 2016, The Wharf also acquired Wheelock House from the parent company Wheelock & Co. and the chairman Peter Woo, which the assets were later injected into the REIC.

In February 2018, Wharf REIC replaced The Wharf (Holdings) as the component of the blue chip index Hang Seng Index.

In December 2019, Wharf REIC acquired Wheelock Place and Scotts Square and the company Wheelock Properties (Singapore) from Wheelock & Co.
