= Yintai =

Yintai may refer to:

- Yintai District, in Tongchuan, Shaanxi, China
- Beijing Yintai Centre, building in Beijing, China
- Beijing Yintai Centre Tower 2, 63-floor 250 meter (820 foot) tall skyscraper
