= Russell Street =

Russell Street may refer to:

- Russell Street (Baltimore), part of the Baltimore–Washington Parkway within Baltimore
- Russell Street, Melbourne
- Russell Street, Hong Kong
- Great Russell Street, London
- Russell Street, Covent Garden, London
