= Pastamania =

Singaporean restaurant chain offering Italian cuisine

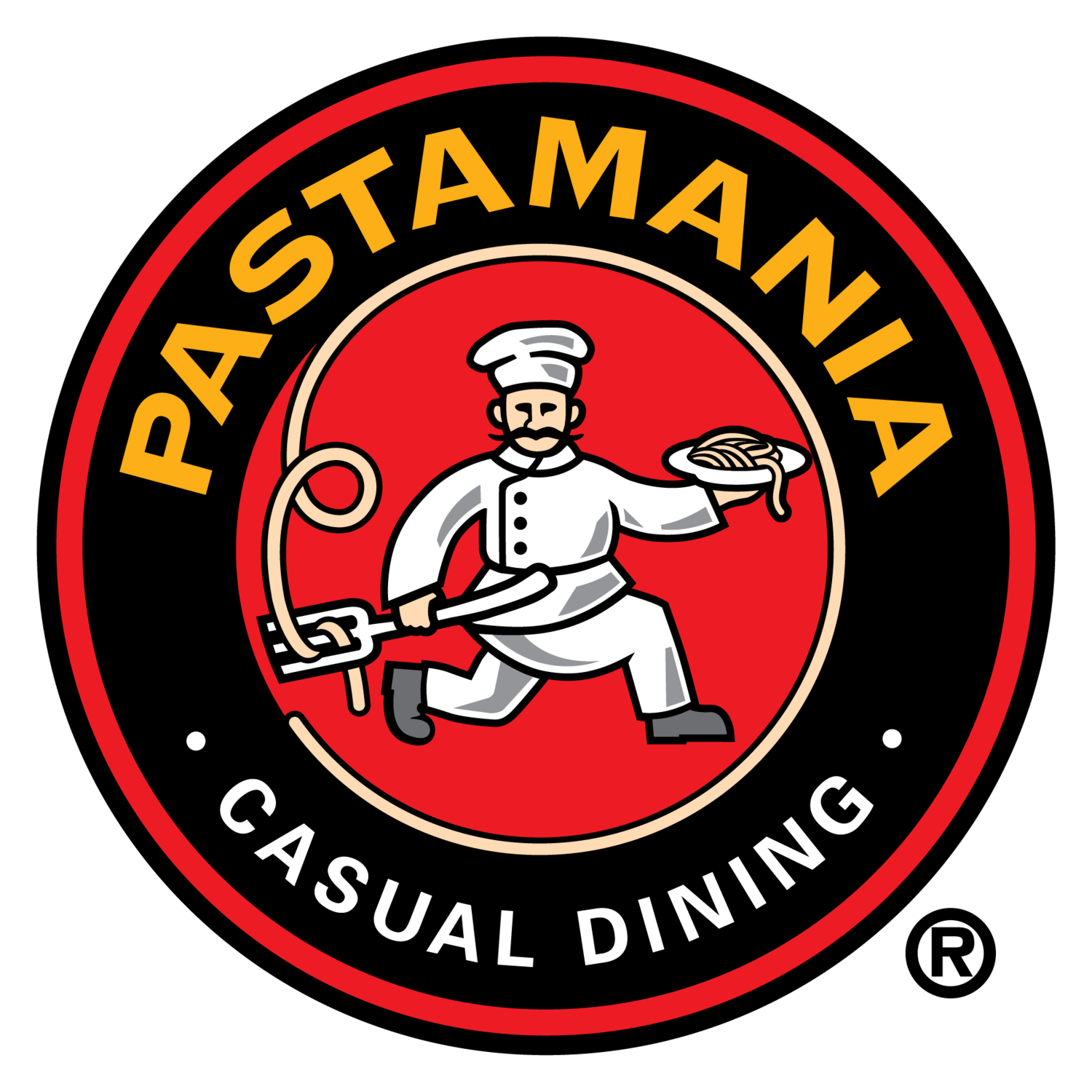
- Company type: Privately held
- Industry: Food and Beverage
- Genre: Italian foodservice
- Founded: 1998; 28 years ago in Singapore
- Headquarters: Singapore
- Products: Pasta and pizza
- Website: Pastamania Homepage

Pastamania is a Singaporean fast casual restaurant chain that specialises in Italian cuisine. It offers mainly pasta and also sells pizza. Aside from Singapore, the restaurant also has outlets in various other countries.

== About ==
The first Pastamania outlet was opened in April 1998, with an outlet within a food court in the basement of Scotts Shopping Centre in Orchard, Singapore. Since then, it has opened a number of outlets in Singapore. It has also expanded its operations to include Malaysia, Kuwait, various Middle Eastern countries, Bangladesh and India. An outlet in Colombo, Sri Lanka opened on 30 March 2018.

Pastamania is currently a franchise offered by Commonwealth Capital Pte Ltd (CCPL).

== Gallery ==
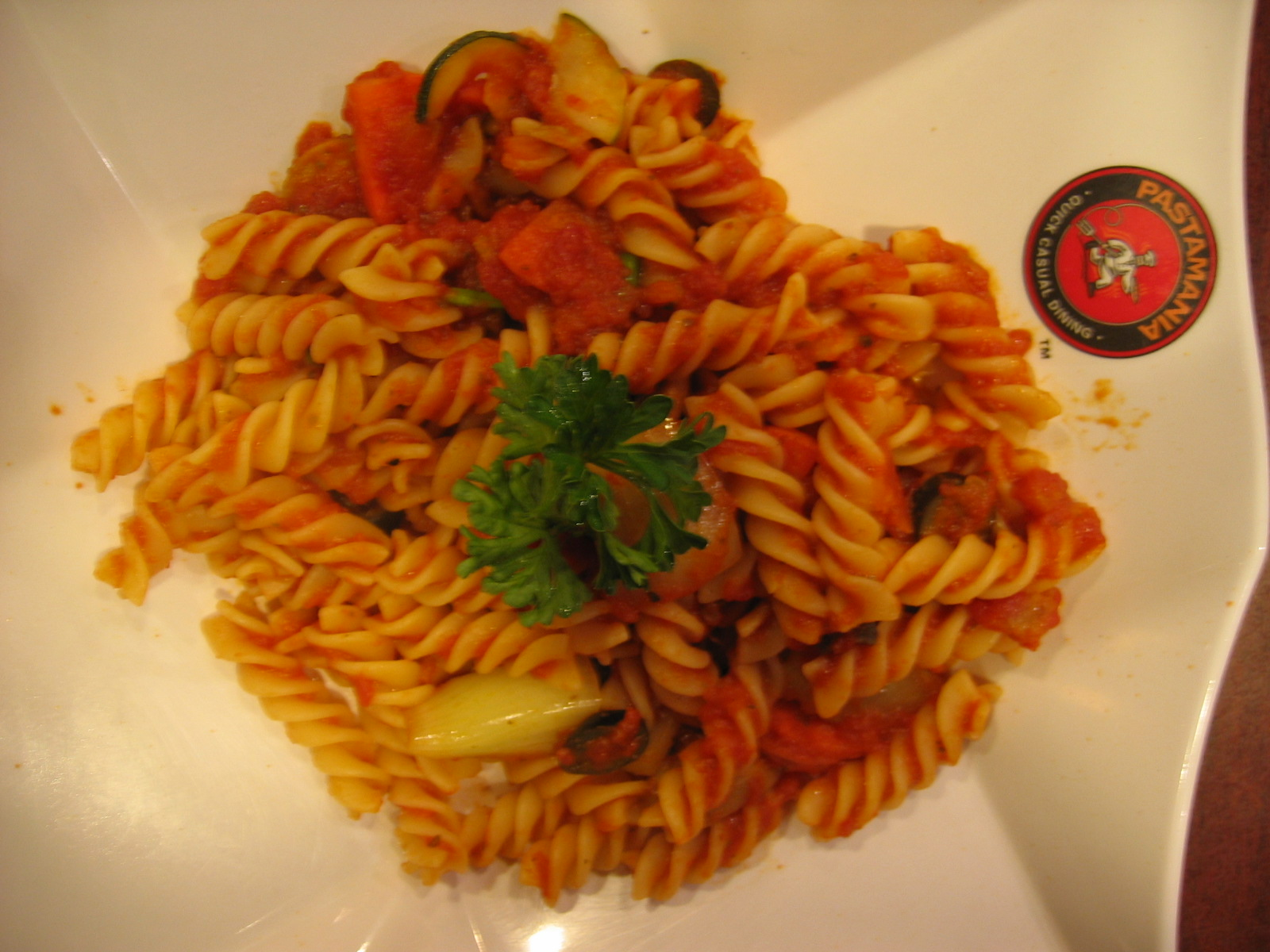
Mediterranean Barilla fusilli
