= Landmark Orchard =

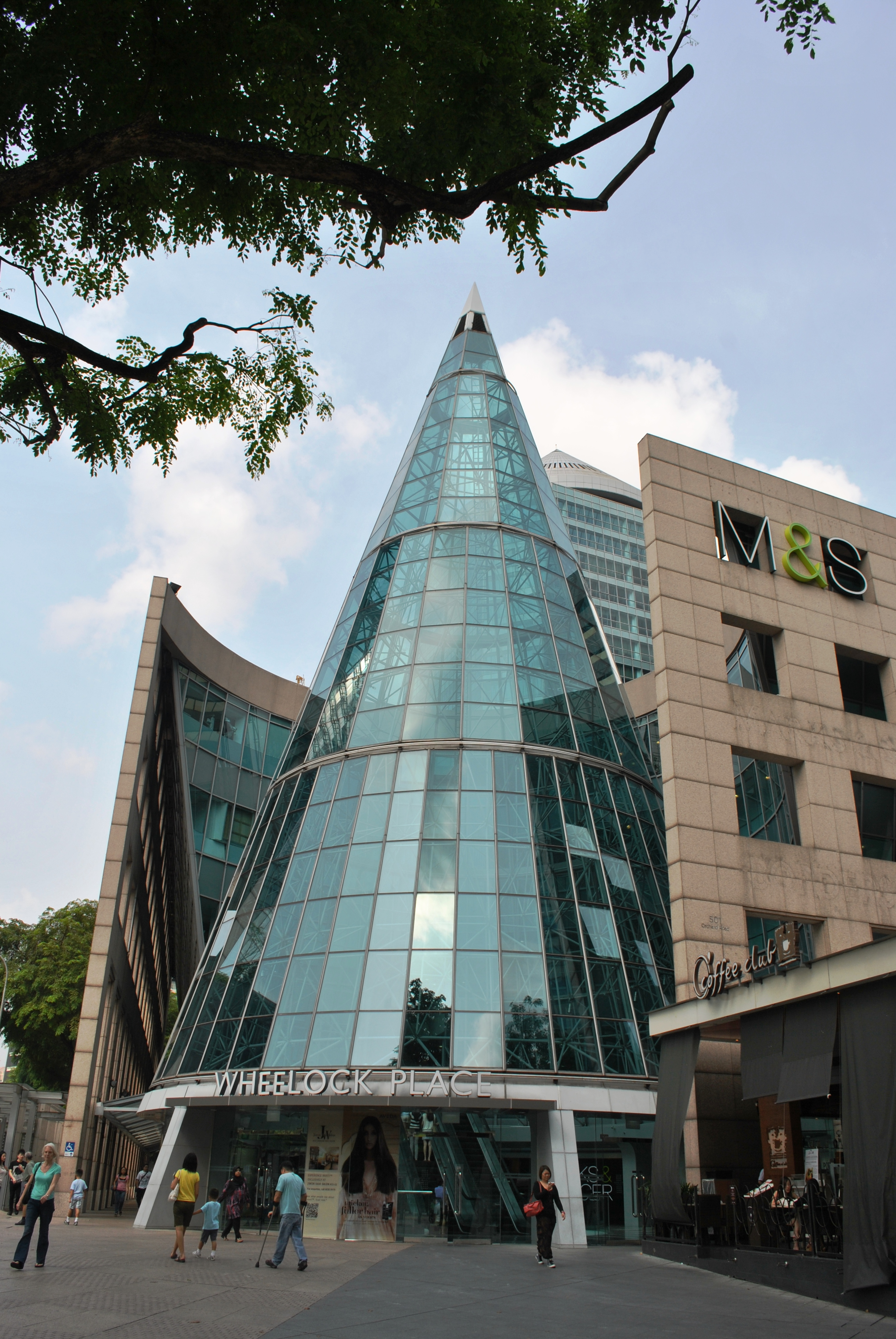
- Landmark Orchard, before its name change, at Orchard Road with its distinctive conical glass structure viewed from the bottom (Above) and the view from the entrance (Below)
- Location: Orchard, Singapore
- Coordinates: 1°18′16.3″N 103°49′50.3″E
- Address: 501 Orchard Road
- Opened: 1993
- Developer: Hongkong Land
- Manager: Hongkong Land
- Owner: Hongkong Land
- Architect: Kisho Kurokawa
- Num. of stores: 26
- Num. of anchor tenants: 6
- Floors: 23
- Website: landmarkorchard.com

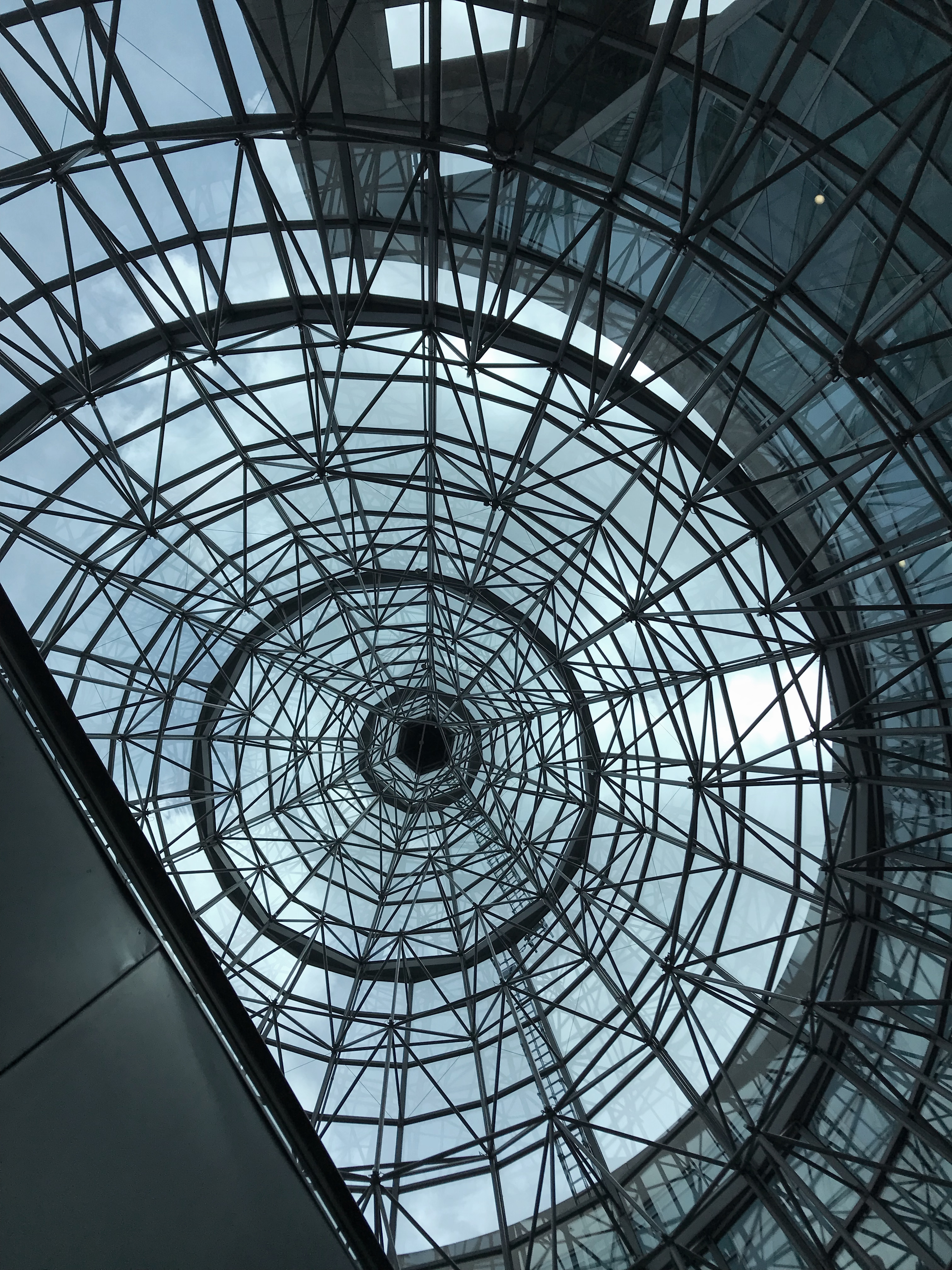
View from the bottom of the conical glass structure

Landmark Orchard (Chinese: 乌节置地坊, Tamil: லேண்ட்மார்க் ஆர்ச்சர்ட்), formerly named Lane Crawford Place (Chinese: 达卡佛坊) from 1994 to 1996 and Wheelock Place (Chinese: 会德丰广场, Tamil: வீல்லாக் ப்லேஸ்) from 1997 to 2026, is a 21-floor office tower and shopping mall on Singapore's Orchard Road. It is owned by Hongkong Land.

== History ==
In 1990, Marco Polo Developments Limited was awarded by the Urban Redevelopment Authority a site at the junction of Orchard, Paterson and Scott Roads to develop a shopping mall and an office tower. The building was to be named Lane Crawford Place. The building was designed by Kisho Kurokawa and completed in 1994. The building initially housed the department store Lane Crawford over five floors which opened in May. It featured the first curved escalators in Singapore, echoing Lane Crawford's installation of the first public curved escalators in the world in 1993 at their Times Square location in Hong Kong, which were developed by Mitsubishi Electric. Four curved escalators were installed at the cost of $1.2 million each.

In 1996, Lane Crawford exited Singapore and with its exit, the building was renamed Wheelock Place in 1997.

In 1997, Borders established its first international store in Wheelock Place, occupying 32,000 square feet (3,000 m^{2}), becoming its flagship store until its sudden closure in 2011. Following which, Marks & Spencer became Wheelock Place's main tenant. A new book shop, Zall Bookstore, opened in 2021.

In July 2026, Hongkong Land purchased the development from Wharf Estates Singapore (formerly Marco Polo Developments Limited) for S$1.1 billion. Three months after the acquisition, on 12 November, it was renamed to Landmark Orchard.

== Access ==
The mall has an underpass to Shaw House and ION Orchard.

== See also ==
- List of shopping malls in Singapore
