= Wharf Estates Singapore =

Singapore subsidiary

Wharf Estates Singapore Pte. Ltd.
- Formerly: Marco Polo Developments Limited; Wheelock Properties (Singapore) Limited; Wheelock Properties (Singapore) Pte. Ltd.
- Type: subsidiary
- Traded as: SGX: M35 (former)
- Industry: Properties
- Founded: 1972
- Headquarters: Singapore, Singapore
- Area served: Singapore
- Key people: Stephen Ng (Chairman)
- Owner: Wharf REIC (100%)
- Parent: Wharf REIC
- Website: www.wharfestates.com.sg

Wharf Estates Singapore Pte. Ltd., formerly Marco Polo Developments Limited, Wheelock Properties (Singapore) Limited and Wheelock Properties (Singapore) Pte. Ltd., engages in property development and investment in Singapore. It is a subsidiary of Wharf Real Estate Investment Company (Wharf REIC), itself a listed subsidiary of Wheelock & Co. Wharf REIC and Wharf Estates Singapore are named after The Wharf (Holdings), another subsidiary of Wheelock & Co..

== Business overview ==
Its development properties are Grange Residences, The Sea View, The Cosmopolitan, Ardmore Park, Ardmore II, Scotts Square, Orchard View and Ardmore 3, and its investment property is Wheelock Place.

== History ==
The company was incorporated in Singapore in 1972 and listed on the Singapore Exchange (SGX) in 1981.

In 1990, Marco Polo Developments Limited developed the shopping mall Wheelock Place which opened in 1994.

In 1995, Marco Polo Developments Limited was sold by The Wharf (Holdings) to its sister company Hongkong Realty. Hongkong Realty later renamed to Wheelock Properties Limited in 2004. Both Hongkong Realty (Wheelock Properties) and The Wharf (Holdings) are Wheelock & Co. subsidiaries. Marco Polo Developments later renamed to Wheelock Properties (Singapore) Limited.

Wheelock Properties (Singapore) Limited was taken over by its parent company Wheelock & Co. and was delisted from the SGX on 18 October 2018, becoming Wheelock Properties (Singapore) Pte. Ltd..

Wheelock & Co. and its subsidiary The Wharf (Holdings)'s formed a spin-off listed company Wharf Real Estate Investment Company (Wharf REIC) for their real estate portfolios. In 2019, Wheelock Properties (Singapore), and its subsidiaries and real estate portfolios were acquired by Wharf REIC.

Circa 2020 Wheelock Properties (Singapore) was renamed Wharf Estates Singapore.

In July 2026, Hongkong Land purchased Wheelock Place from Wharf Estates Singapore for S$1.1 billion.
