= Percival Street =

Street in Causeway Bay, Hong Kong

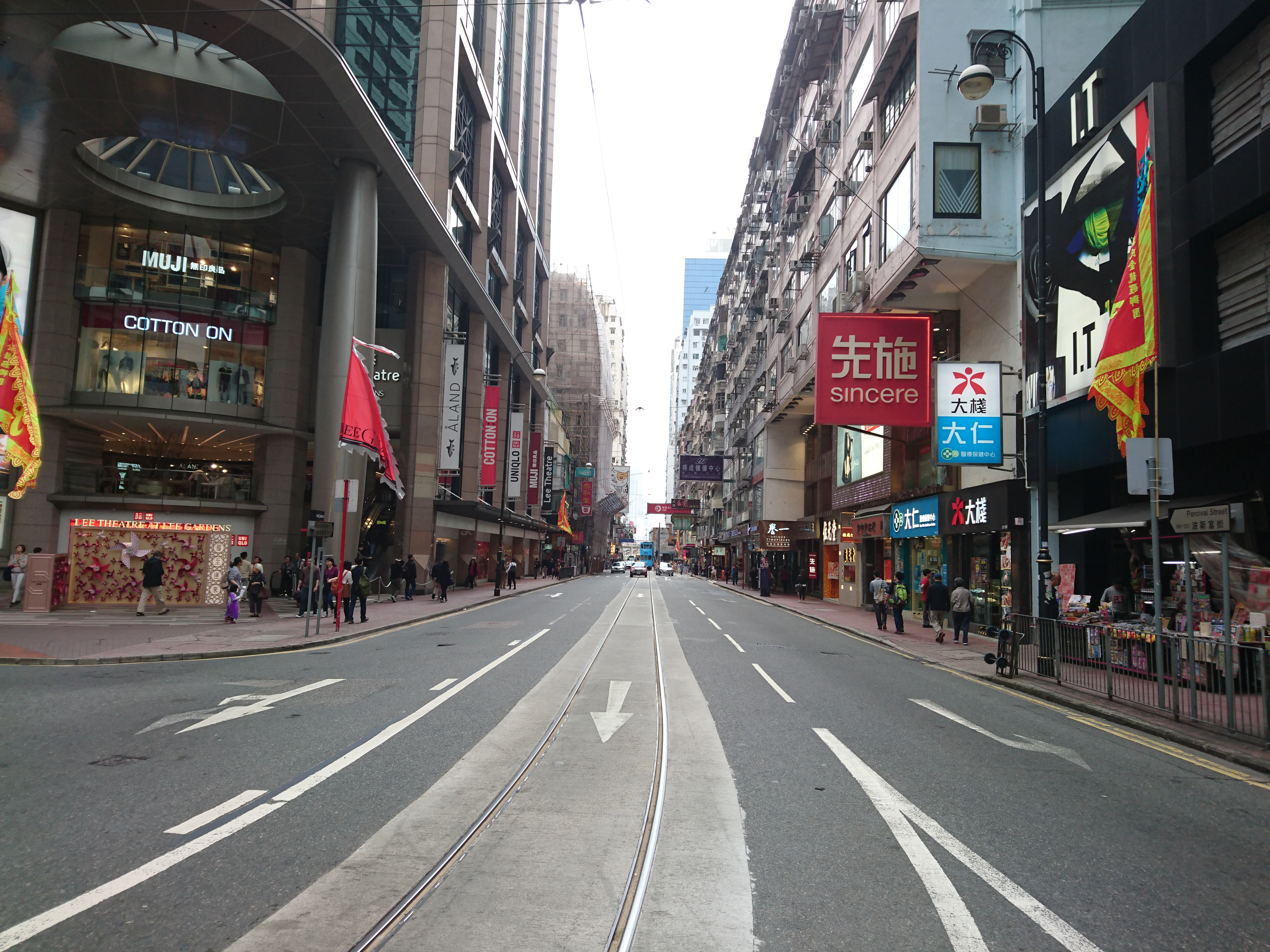
- Percival Street
- Native name: 波斯富街 (Yue Chinese)
- Namesake: Alexander Perceval
- Location: Causeway Bay, Hong Kong
- Coordinates: 22.2797°N 114.1827°E

Percival Street
- Chinese: 波斯富街
Transcriptions
Standard Mandarin
- Hanyu Pinyin: Bōsīfù Jiē
Yue: Cantonese
- Yale Romanization: Bō sī fu gāai
- Jyutping: Bo1 si1 fu3 gaai1

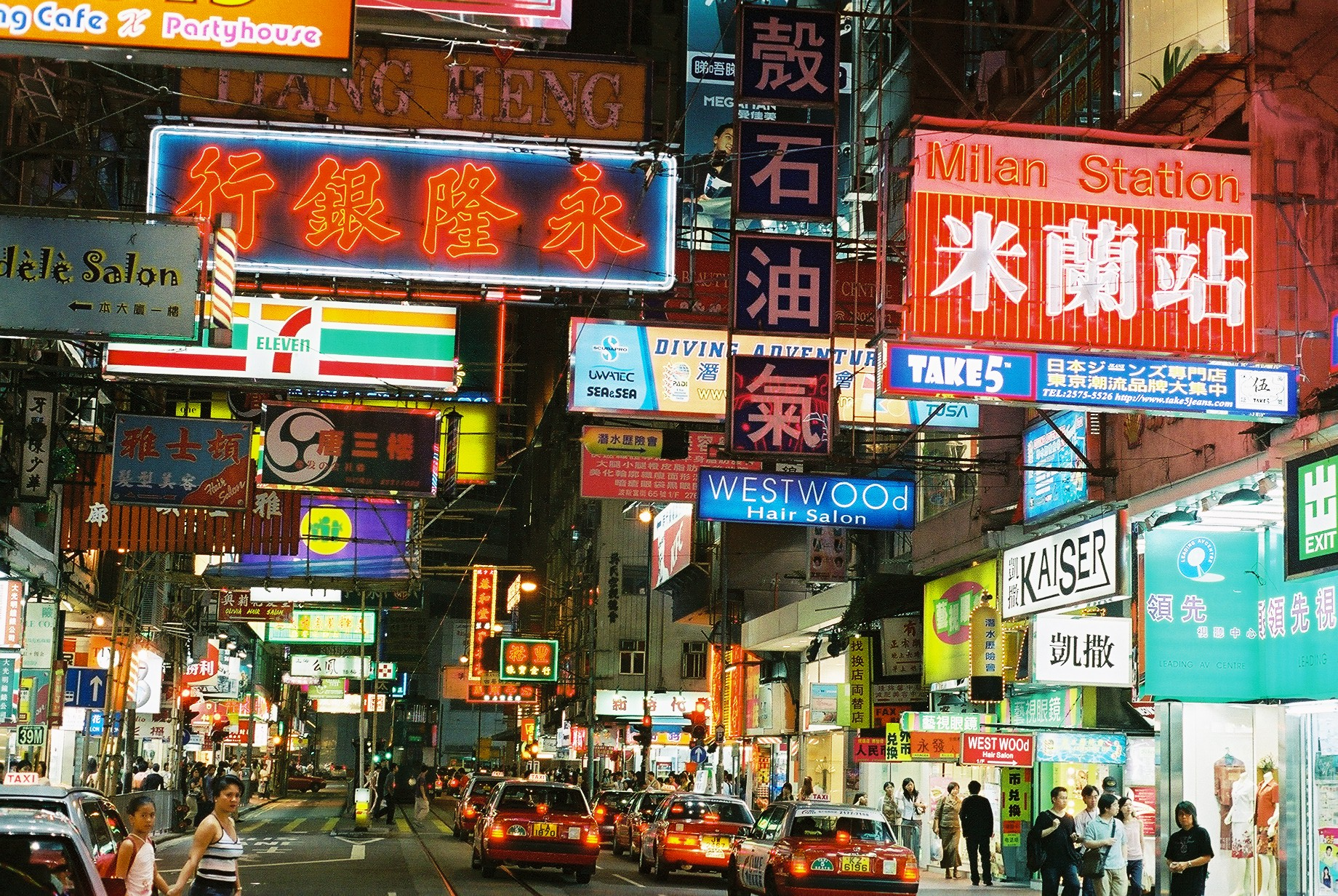
Night view

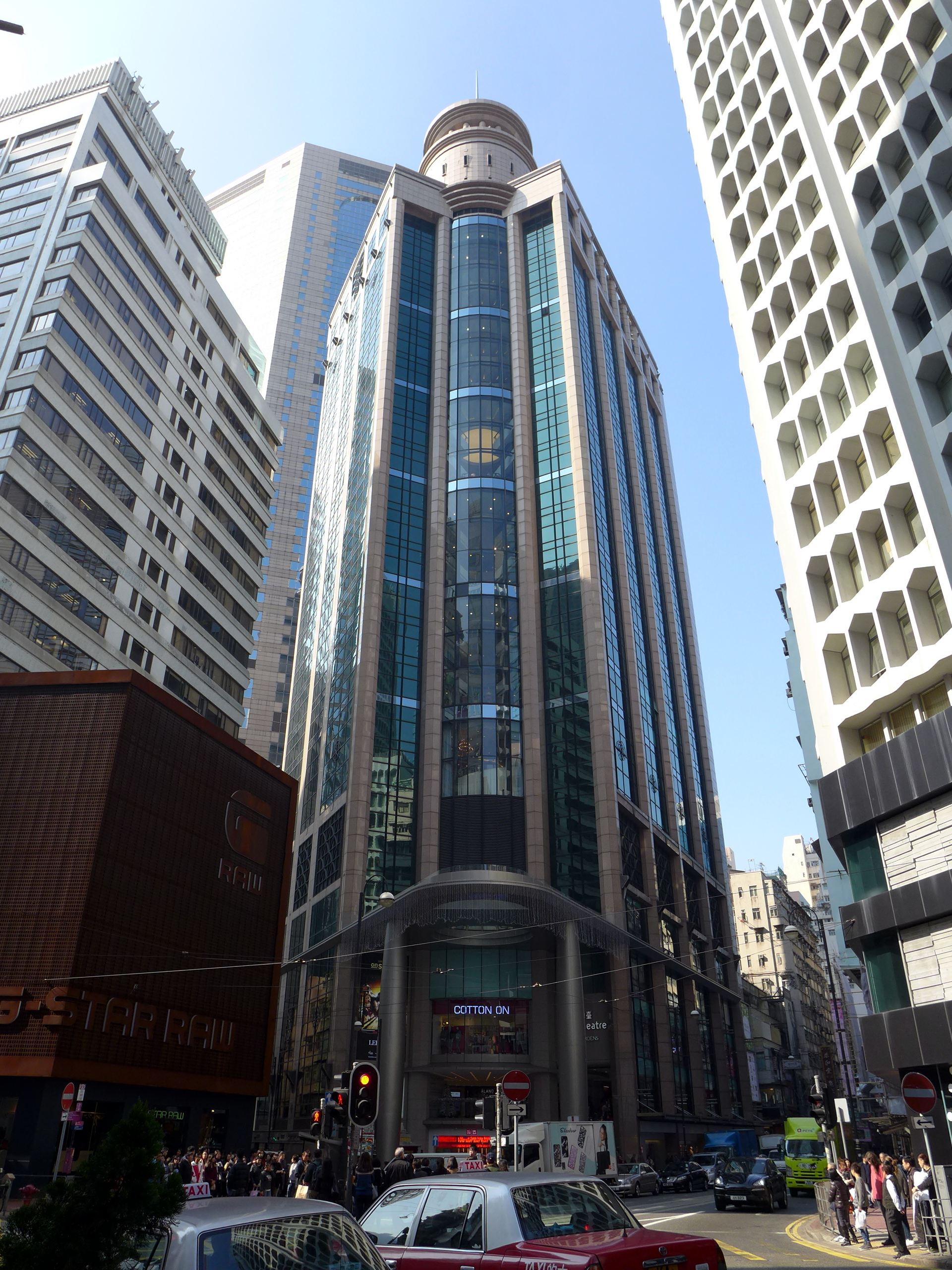
Lee Theatre

Percival Street is a street in the East Point and Happy Valley, Hong Kong Island, Hong Kong. The street spans from Gloucester Road in the north to Leighton Road in the south. Between Hennessy Road and Leighton Road, the street is with a branch of Hong Kong Tramways leading to Happy Valley. It is estimated that on average the annual rent per square feet for retailing here is US$2300 annually on average, second to US$2500 in Fifth Avenue, United States. It is also one of the major streets occupied during Occupy movement in 2014.

== History ==
The road was named after Alexander Perceval, a 19th-century tai-pan of Jardine Matheson. The land of the present-day Times Square was a tram depot at Matheson Street. Trams returned to the depot via Perceval Street and Russell Street. Another historical building was the Lee Theatre. It was later demolished to build Lee Theatre Plaza shopping centre.

== Shopping ==
Apart from Lee Theatre Plaza, two shopping centres Causeway Bay Plaza 1 and Causeway Bay Plaza 2 are also located along the road.

== See also ==
- List of streets and roads in Hong Kong
