= Modern Terminals =

Container terminal operator in Hong Kong

Modern Terminals Limited 現代貨箱碼頭有限公司
- Company type: Privately held company
- Industry: Container port operator
- Founded: 1969; 57 years ago
- Headquarters: Kwai Chung, Hong Kong
- Area served: Hong Kong
- Key people: Chairman: Stephen Ng; Group Managing Director: Horace Lo
- Parent: The Wharf (Holdings)
- Website: Modern Terminals Limited

Modern Terminals Limited (Modern Terminals or MTL), is the second largest container terminal operator in Hong Kong, just after Hongkong International Terminals Limited. It operates terminal 1, 2, 5 and 9 (South) in Kwai Tsing Container Terminals in Hong Kong, and also sets up joint-venture in container terminals in Shenzhen, Guangdong and Taicang, Jiangsu in Mainland China.

In the 1990s, MTL's largest shareholders were the Wharf (Holdings), China Merchants Holdings (International) and Swire Pacific.

Swire Pacific sold all the shares of MTL to the Wharf (Holdings) and China Merchants Holdings (International) in 2003. It is now the subsidiary of Wharf (Holdings) and its shareholders China Merchants Holdings (International) and Jebsen Group.

On March 4, 2021, CCN reported that Modern Terminals, the second-largest container terminal operator in Hong Kong, joined the TradeLens project, a blockchain-enabled technological solution developed by Maersk and IBM.
