= Harbour Centre Development =

Hotel and restaurant company in Hong Kong

Harbour Centre Development Limited 海港企業有限公司
- Company type: Listed company
- Traded as: SEHK: 51
- Industry: Hotel management and Properties
- Founded: 1971
- Headquarters: Hong Kong Island, Hong Kong
- Area served: Hong Kong
- Key people: Chairman: Mr. Stephen Ng
- Owner: Wharf REIC (72%)
- Parent: Wharf REIC
- Website: www.harbourcentre.com.hk

Harbour Centre Development Limited (Chinese: 海港企業有限公司) is a subsidiary of Wharf Real Estate Investment Company of Hong Kong and engages in the operation of hotels and restaurants, and the property development business in Hong Kong and Mainland China. It was founded and listed on the Hong Kong Stock Exchange in 1971.
