= Joyce (clothing retailer) =

Hong Kong fashion retailer

Joyce Boutique Holdings Limited
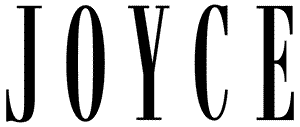
- Company type: Listed company
- Traded as: SEHK: 647
- Industry: Fashion retailing
- Founded: 1970; 56 years ago
- Founder: Joyce Ma
- Headquarters: Hong Kong, China
- Area served: Hong Kong and Mainland China
- Key people: Chairman: Mr. Stephen Ng
- Website: JOYCE Boutique Holdings Limited

Joyce Boutique Holdings Limited (stylized as JOYCE) is a Hong Kong fashion retailer which is engaged in the franchise of fashion, accessories and cosmetics designer brands in Greater China under the name "JOYCE" or mono brand freestanding stores. It operates 40 points of sale across Greater China including five JOYCE multi-brand boutiques and over 10 JOYCE Beauty store concepts.

It was founded by Mrs. Joyce Ma (Chinese: 馬郭志清) in 1970. Its shares were listed on the Hong Kong Stock Exchange in 1990. In 2000, Wheelock and Company Limited acquired a 51% stake of JOYCE from the Ma family, the largest shareholder. In 2003, Wheelock's shares were transferred to Mr. Peter Woo's family trust, and JOYCE Boutique became a member of the Lane Crawford JOYCE Group.

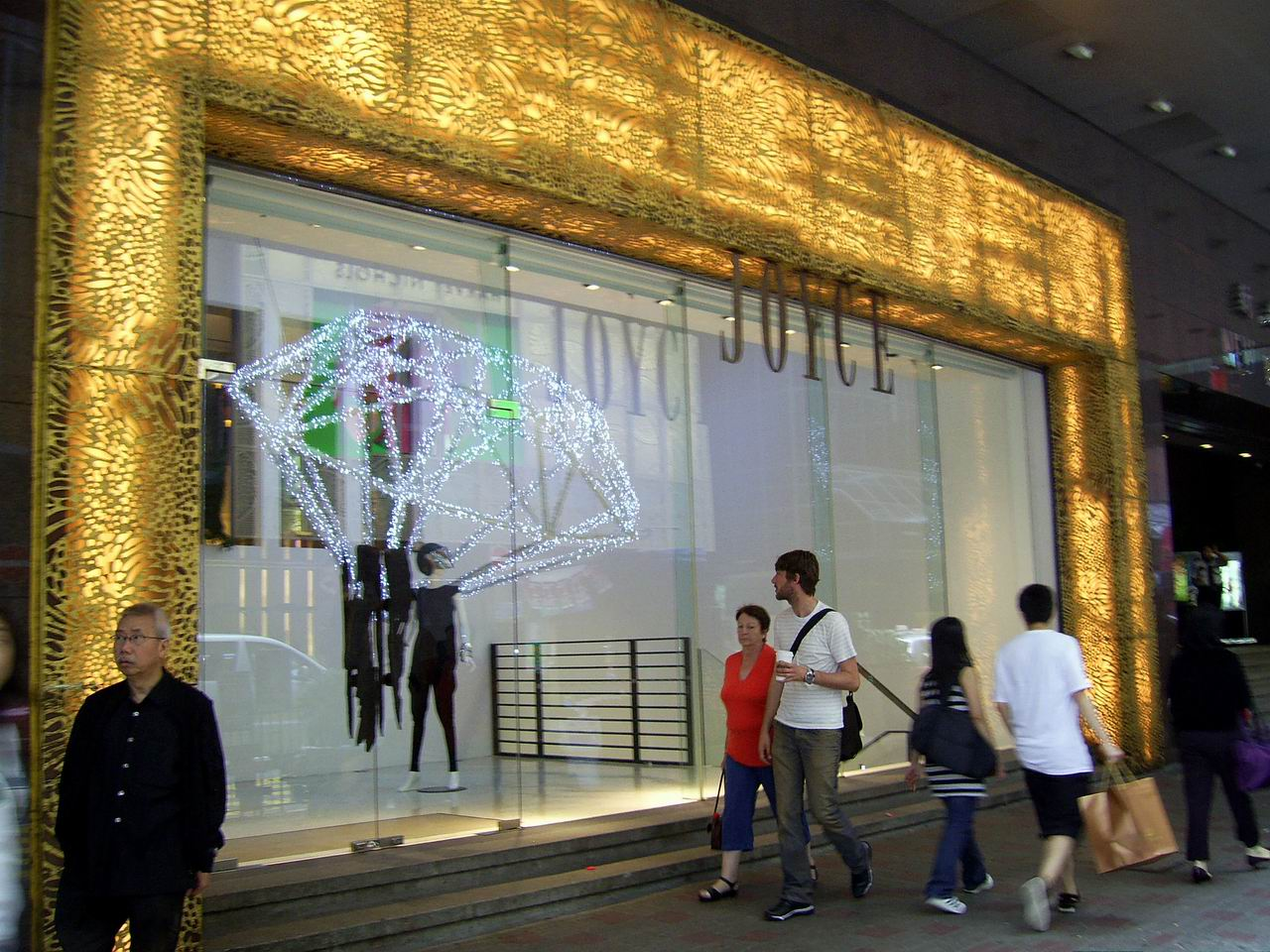
JOYCE Boutique in New World Centre in Central

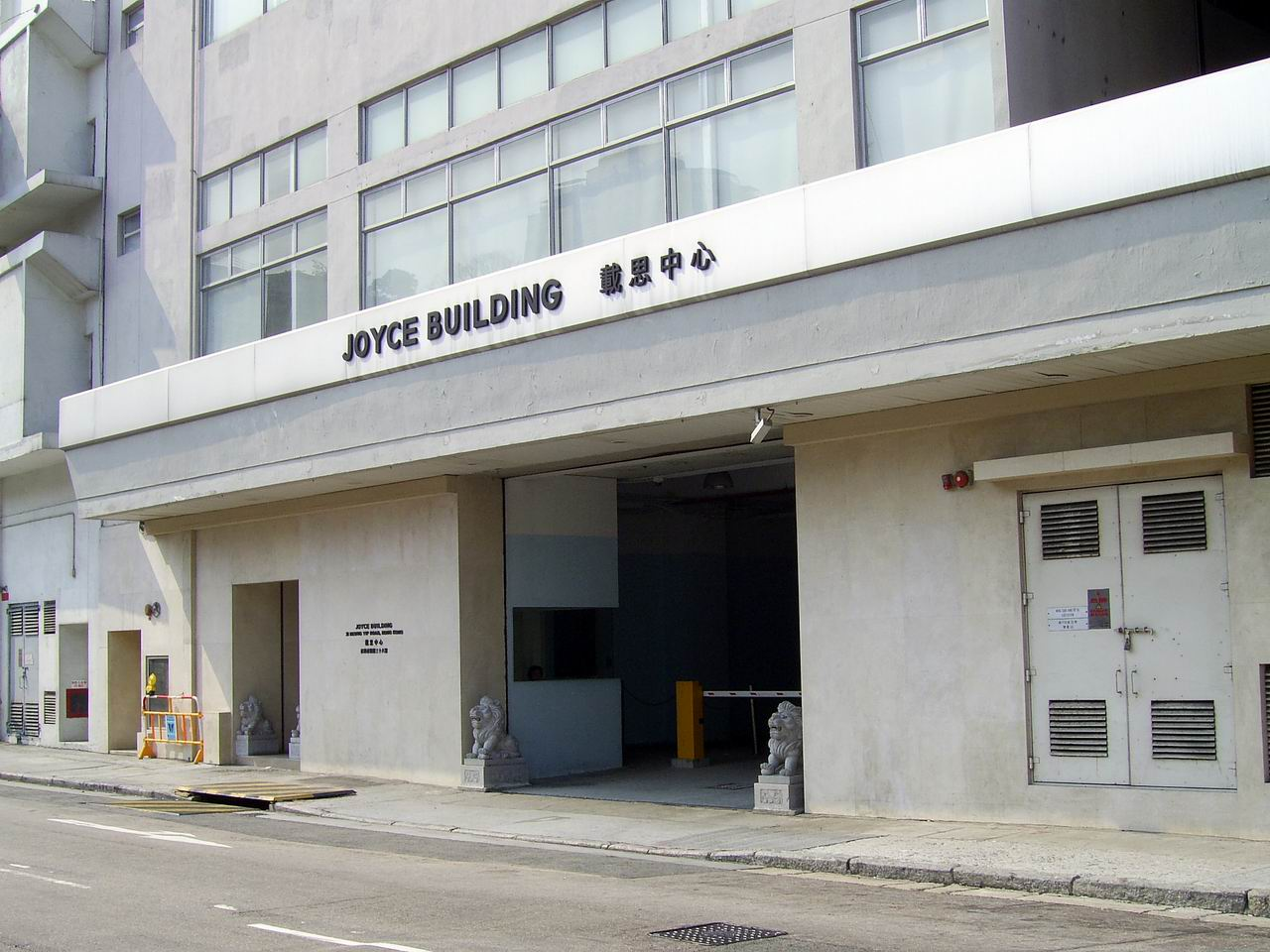
JOYCE headquarters in Wong Chuk Hang
