= Scotts Shopping Centre =

Scotts Shopping Centre and the Ascott Singapore
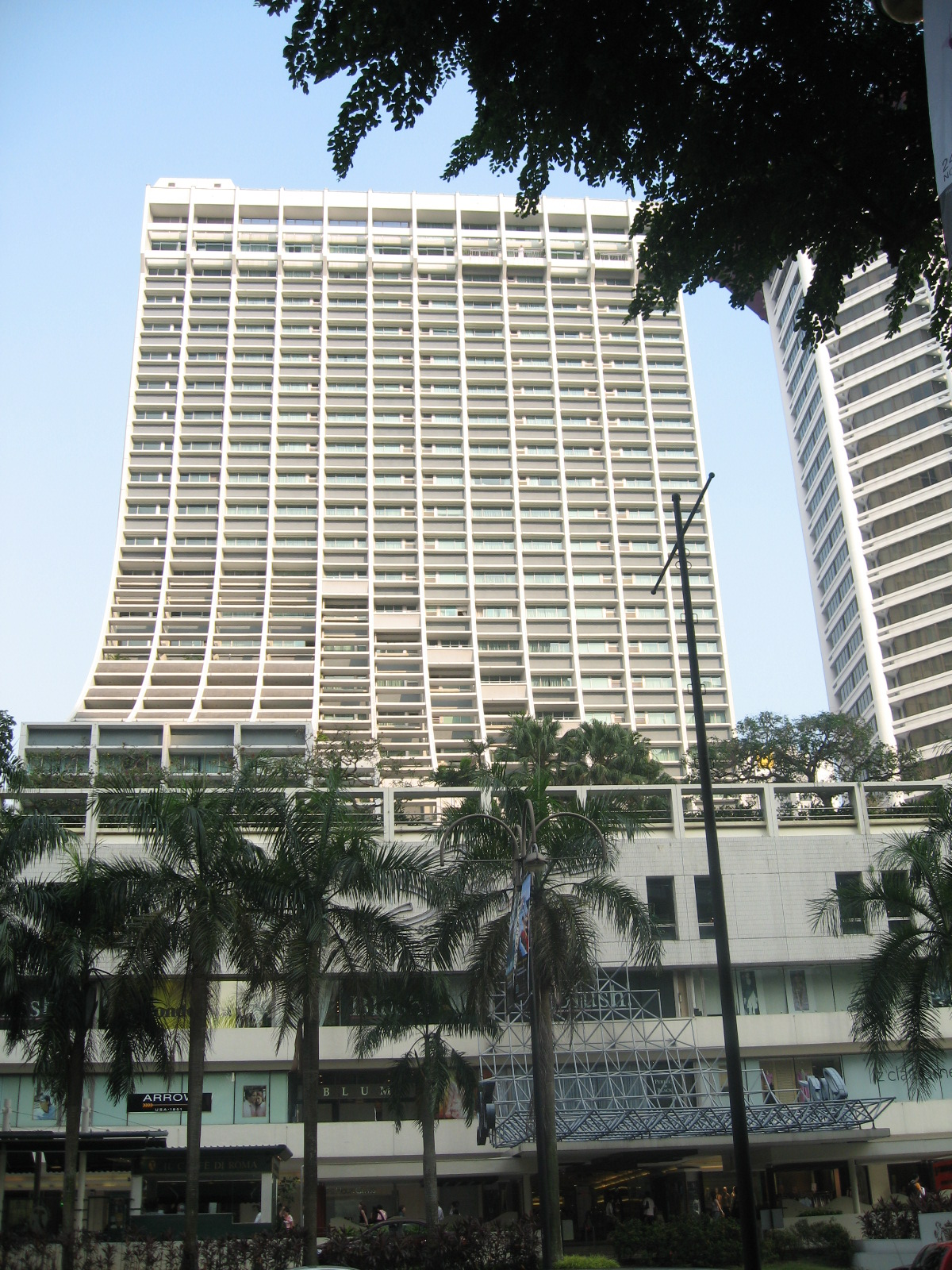

- Location within Singapore

General information
- Status: Demolished
- Type: Residential, Shopping mall
- Location: Singapore, 6 Scotts Road, Singapore 228209
- Coordinates: 1.3066°N 103.8305°E
- Completed: 1982; 44 years ago
- Closed: C. 2007
- Demolished: 2007; 19 years ago
- Owner: Wheelock Properties (Singapore)
- Operator: The Ascott Group

Height
- Roof: 68.9 m (226 ft)

Technical details
- Floor count: 25

Design and construction
- Architect: Alfred Wong Partnership Private Limited

References
- http://www.scottssquareretail.com

The Scotts Shopping Centre was a shopping mall in Singapore, located along Scotts Road in the Orchard Road vicinity. The mall was branded as a high-end boutique mall with outlets like Pois, Blush, Crème, and Kiehl's, with professional women as its target demographic.

== History ==
Opened in 1982, The mall occupied the first five floors with 8,632 m^{2} of net lettable area of No. 6 Scotts Road. Above the mall was a 23-storey, 153-unit serviced apartment complex known as The Ascott, which was previously owned by The Ascott Group. This branding was a result of a makeover in 1985, prior to which it catered chiefly to the needs of wealthy Indonesian tourists. Also in 1985, the first air-conditioned food court in Singapore, Picnic Food Court, was opened.

In 2004, The Ascott Group sold the entire building to Wheelock Properties (Singapore) (then known as Marco Polo Developments) for S$345 million. but continued to manage the serviced apartments till 31 December 2006.

The shopping mall, previously under the management of CapitaLand Retail, was transferred to Wheelock Properties.

== Demolition ==
In 2006, Wheelock Properties announced plans to demolish the entire building and redevelop it as a luxury residential development of 43 floors, of which three floors would be devoted to an upmarket shopping mall. The mall was demolished on the following year in 2007.

Development on the new building, known as Scotts Square, began in 2007 and was completed in 2011.
