= Lane Crawford =

Hong Kong retail company

- Trade name: Lane Crawford (HK) Limited
- Native name: 連卡佛
- Industry: Fashion retailing, department stores
- Founded: 1850, Hong Kong
- Headquarters: Hong Kong
- Area served: Hong Kong & Mainland China
- Key people: Jennifer Woo (Chairman and CEO)
- Parent: The Lane Crawford Joyce Group
- Website: LaneCrawford.com

Lane Crawford
- Traditional Chinese: 連卡佛
- Simplified Chinese: 连卡佛
Transcriptions
Standard Mandarin
- Hanyu Pinyin: Lián Kǎ Fó
Yue: Cantonese
- Jyutping: lin4 kaa1 fat6

Lane Crawford (HK) Limited (Chinese: 連卡佛) is a retail company founded in 1850 operating specialist department stores selling luxury goods in Hong Kong and Mainland China. It is headquartered in One Island South, Wong Chuk Hang.

Lane Crawford is a part of the Lane Crawford Joyce Group, which also owns the fashion retailer, Joyce Boutique.

== History ==
=== Early history ===
In August 1850, two Scots, Thomas Ash Lane and Ninian Crawford opened a shop in a makeshift bamboo structure on the waterfront at the present location of Des Voeux Road. Taking each of their individual surnames, Lane Crawford later occupied a number of retail sites along Des Voeux Road and Queen's Road Central. In the early 1900s, it expanded with stores in Guangzhou and Shanghai in China, and Kobe and Tokyo in Japan. It offered services including a tailor and outfitter, a draper, a provisions dealer, a wine and spirits merchant, an auctioneer of antiques, a baker, a restaurant, as well as a bar.

During the Japanese Occupation of Hong Kong between 1941 and 1945, all Lane Crawford properties and assets were taken over by the Japanese Authorities, who transferred the store's operations to the Japanese chain, Matsuzakaya.

Following damages resulting from the Second Sino-Japanese War, Lane Crawford had to rebuild from scratch, so it began expanding its import-export division from foodstuffs to luxury items such as cosmetics and pearls. By 1975, jewellery accounted for 42 percent of sales.

=== Present ===
In 2004, Lane Crawford opened a revamped retail store at IFC Mall. In 2007, the company opened a store at Pacific Place Mall, Hong Kong, focusing on furniture and other lifestyle items. In July 2007, the company returned its presence in Beijing, with the opening of its store in Seasons Place Mall following a HK$300 million investment. The opening of the Beijing store follows the closing of other stores in Hangzhou, Shanghai, and Harbin following a strategy change. During this time, Lane Crawford's focus shifted into becoming specialty department store selling speciality products like haute couture.

In 2012, its second Beijing store was opened at the Yintai Centre. In October 2013, Lane Crawford opened its Shanghai flagship store at Shanghai Times Square. In March 2014, the Chengdu store was opened at Chengdu IFS. In 2014, after 21 years of service, the fashion director of Lane Crawford, Sarah Rutson, left the company.

In June 2017, Lane Crawford was subject to a significant number of complaints by Chinese consumers following mass cancellations of orders that have already been paid for. Following a meeting with the Consumer Protection Agency of China, the company issued a statement justifying the cancellations of 213 orders, citing erroneous pricing due to a systematic error on their website.

In 2020, the president of Lane Crawford, Andrew Keith, left the company after 9 years and was replaced by Blondie Tsang. Jennifer Woo is the current Chairman and CEO of the company.

== Awards ==
- 2008: National Retail Federation's International Award
- 2009: Association for Retail Environment's award for Store of the Year for the Lane Crawford Seasons Place, Beijing
- 2010: WGSN Global Fashion Awards for Outstanding Visual Merchandising
- 2011: Racie's Gold Award for International Campaign awarded by the NRF's Retail Advertising Marketing Association
- 2015: Super Retailer of the Year in the Hong Kong Retail Industry Trade Awards.

== Gallery ==
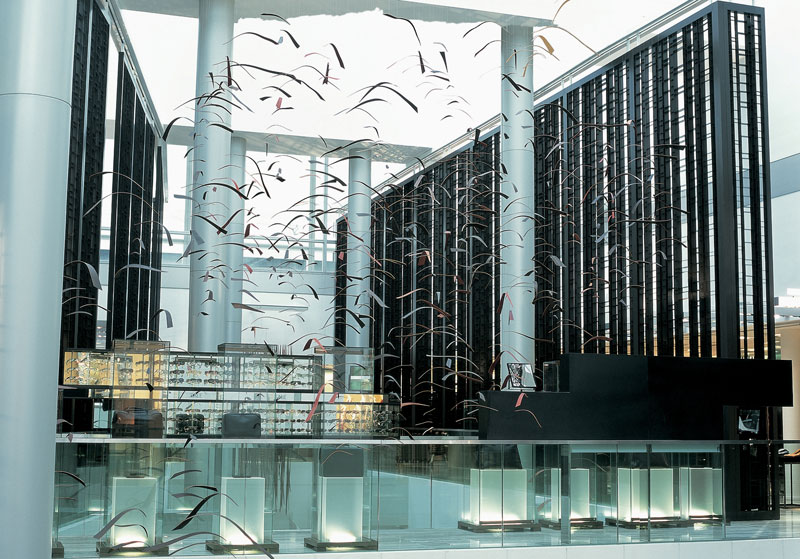
Lane Crawford ifc Mall – Art installation by Hirotoshi Sawada

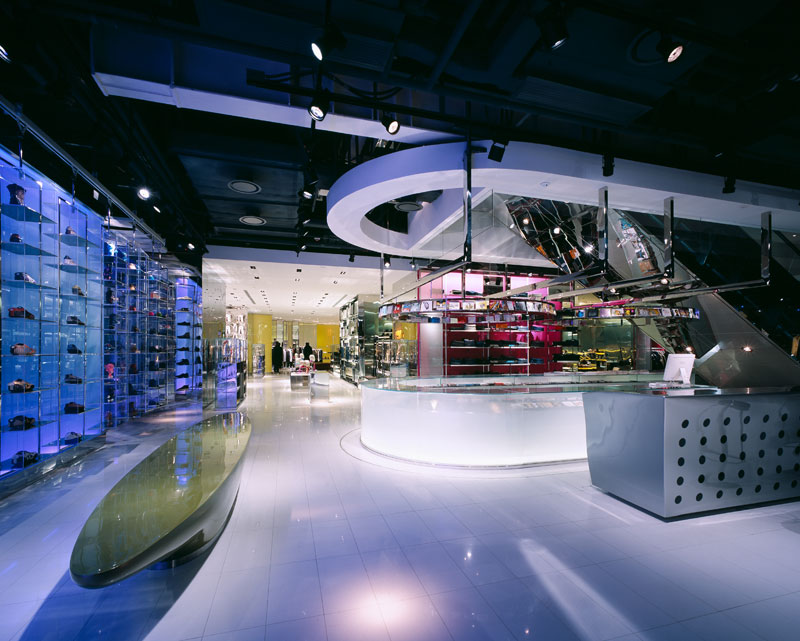
Lane Crawford Pacific Place – Men's Contemporary Department

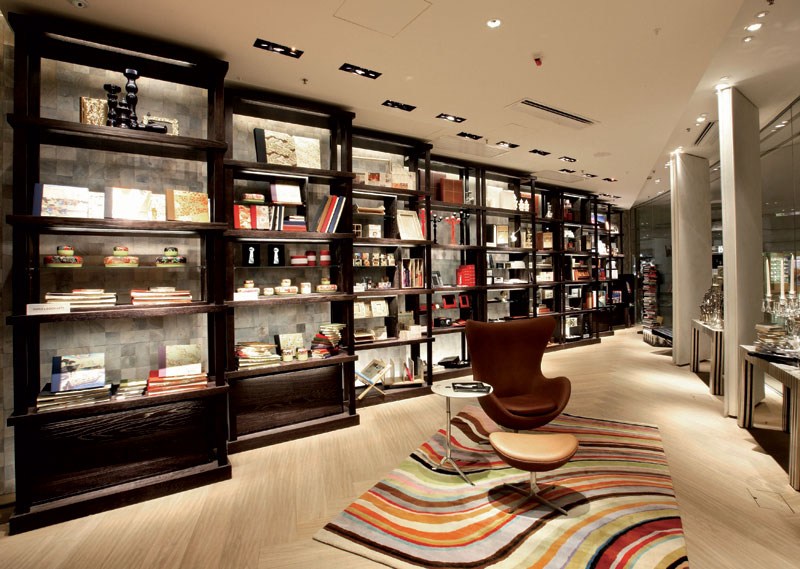
Lane Crawford Pacific Place Home – Home Office Department

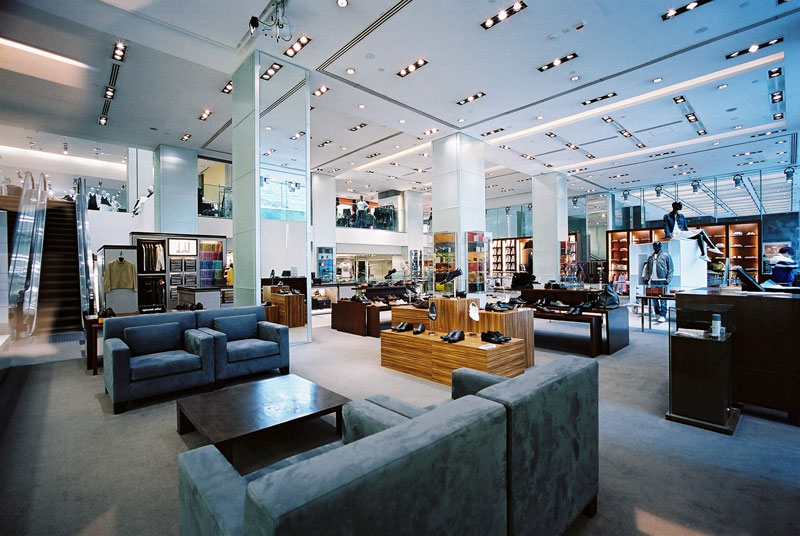
Lane Crawford Canton Road – Men's Shoes and Accessories Department

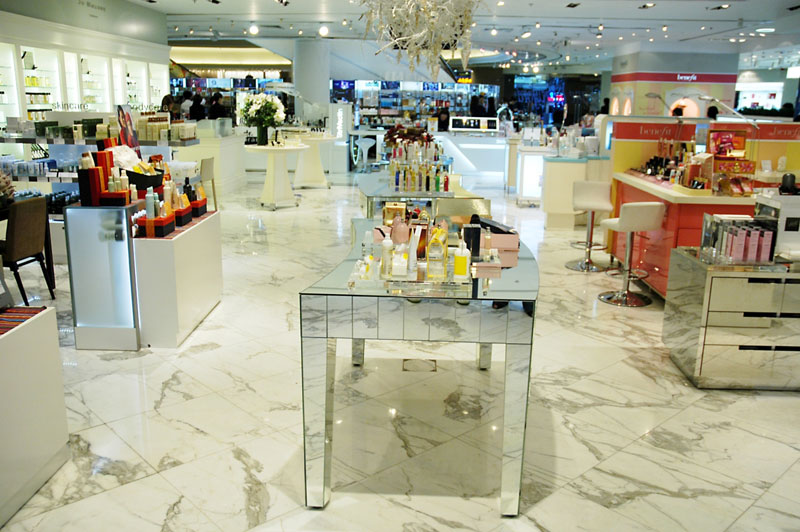
Lane Crawford Times Square – Cosmetic Area

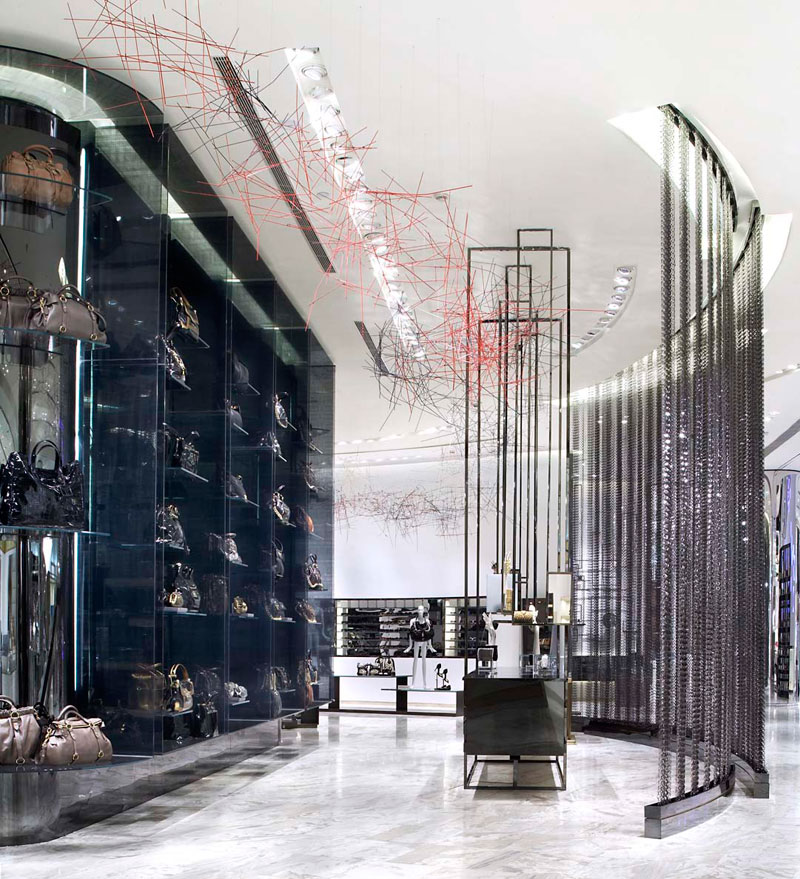
Lane Crawford Seasons Place Beijing – Ladies Shoes and Accessories Department

== Store locations ==
- IFC Mall, Central, Hong Kong, China
- Times Square, Causeway Bay, Hong Kong, China
- Pacific Place home store, Pacific Place Mall, Admiralty, Hong Kong
- Ocean Terminal, Tsim Sha Tsui, Kowloon, Hong Kong
- Seasons Place, Xicheng District, Beijing, China
- Yintai Centre, Chaoyang District, Beijing, China
- Times Square, Huangpu, Shanghai, China
- Chengdu IFS, Jinjiang, Chengdu, China
