= Russell Street, Hong Kong =

Russell Streets in Hong Kong

Coordinates: 22.27889°N 114.18269°E

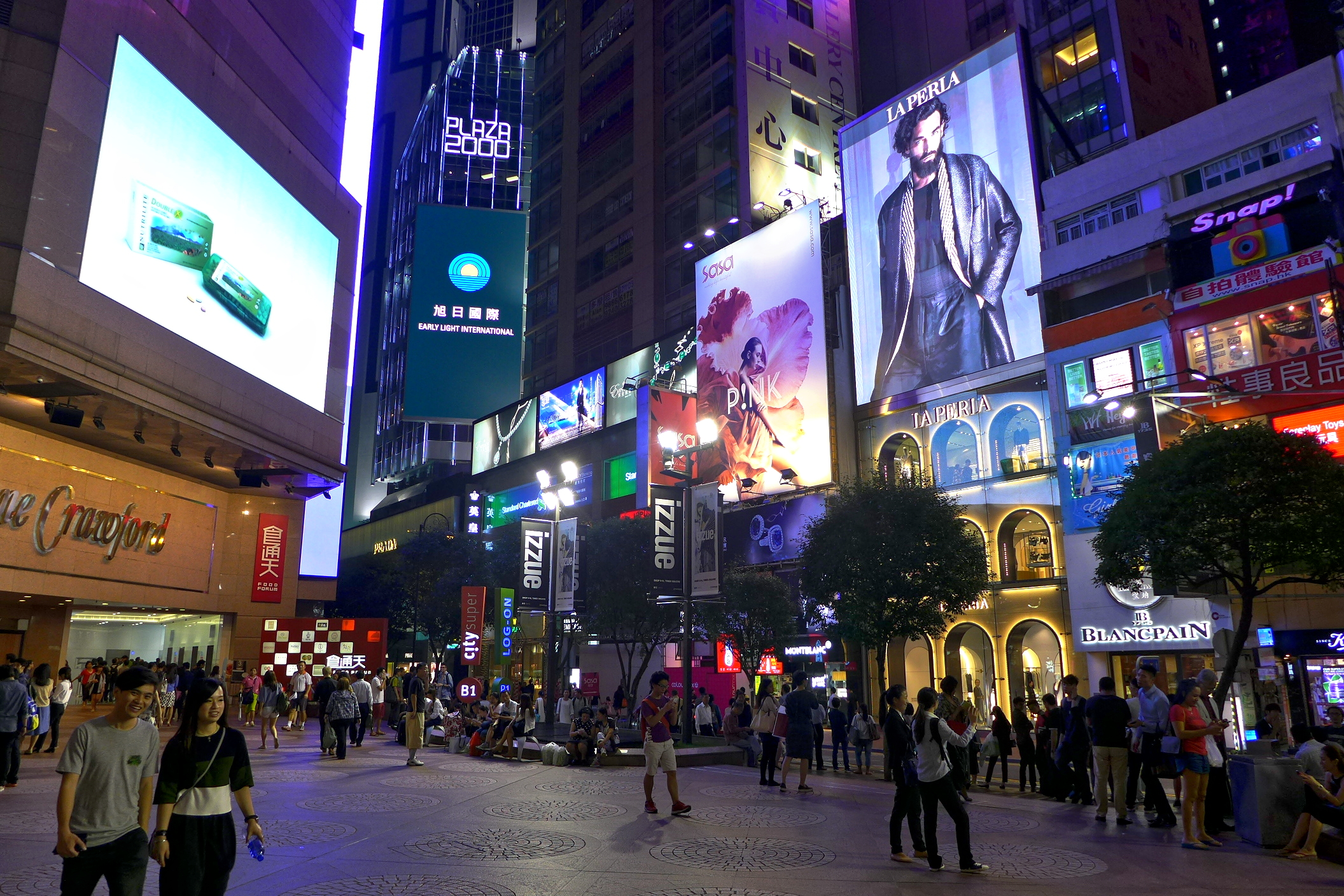
Russell Street, Hong Kong

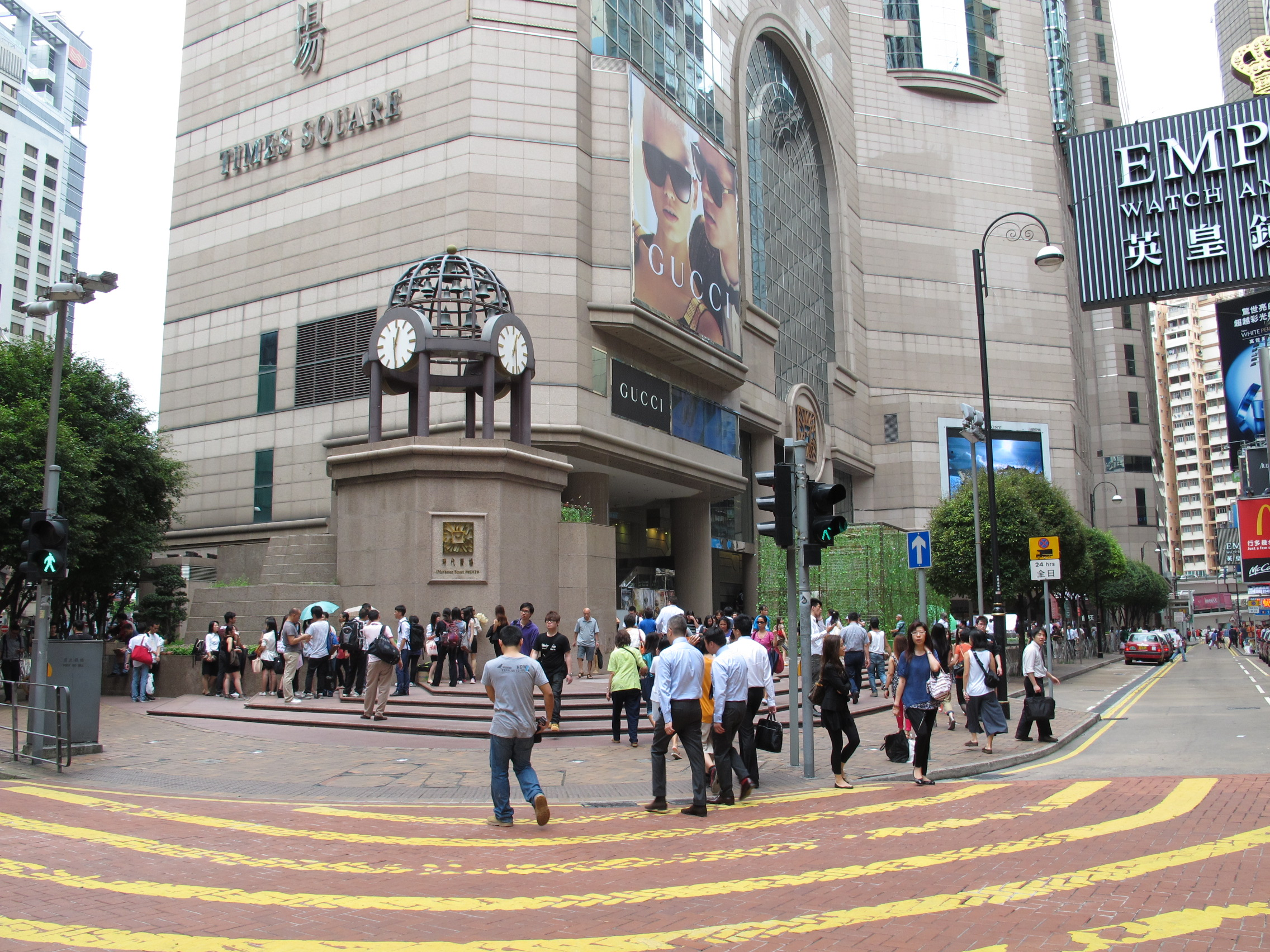
Facade of Times Square, at the intersection of Russell Street and Matheson Street

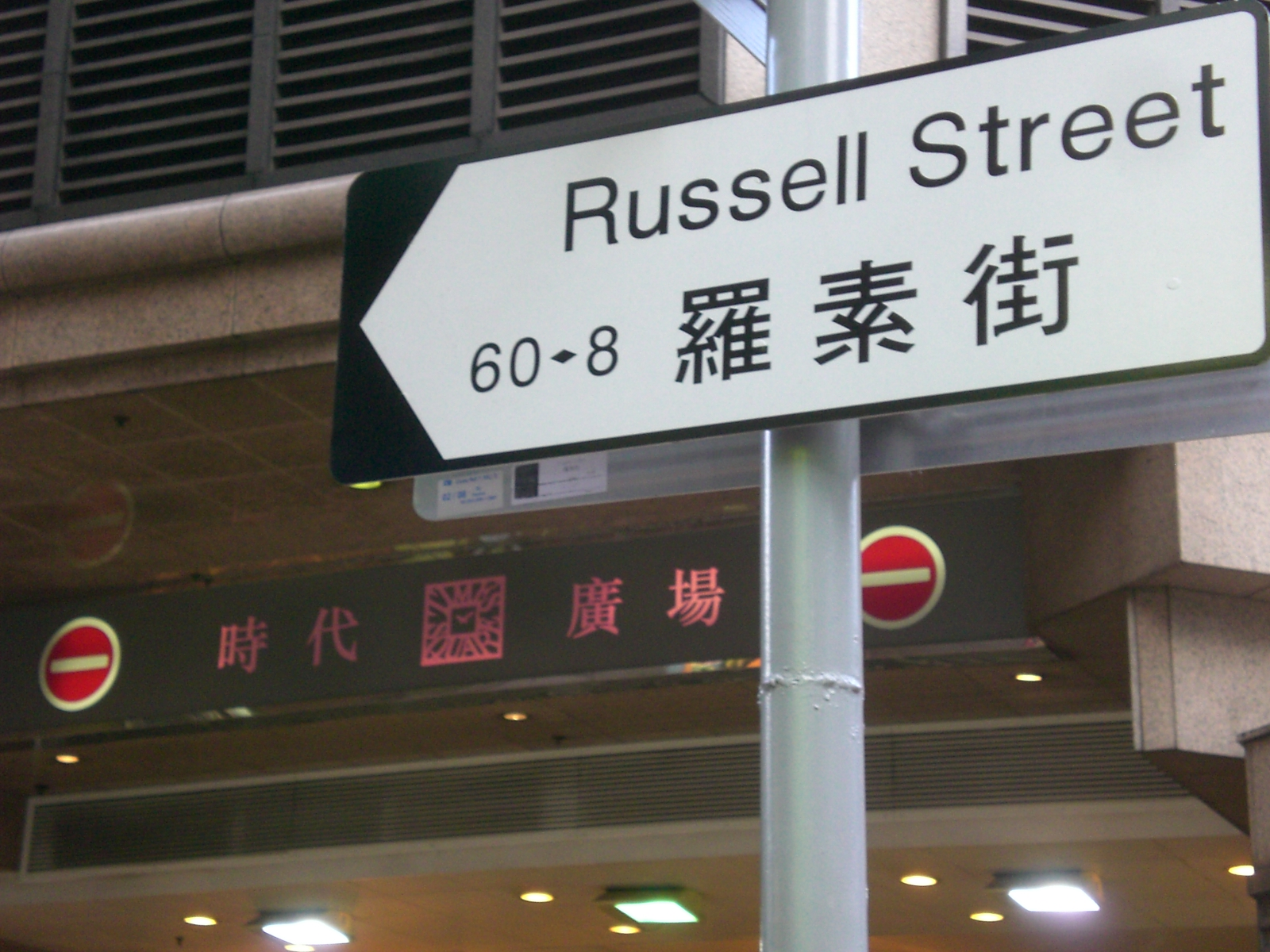
Road sign

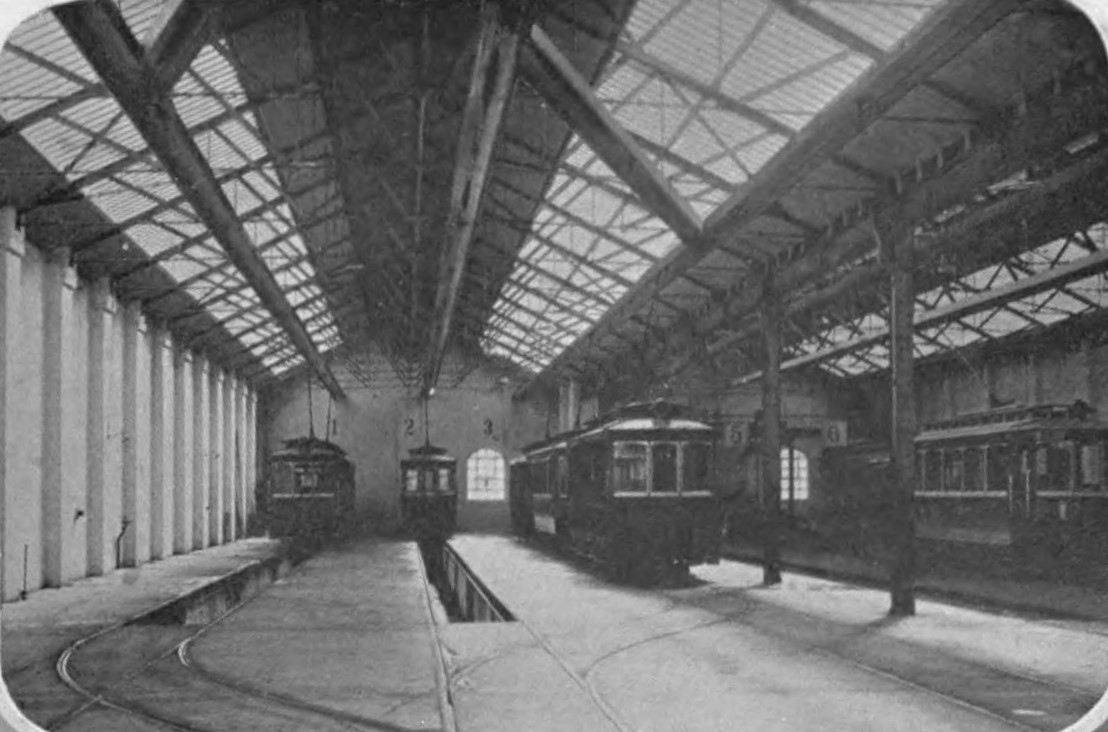
Russell Street Tram Depot c. 1908.

Russell Street (Chinese: 羅素街) in Causeway Bay, Hong Kong Island, is a commercial shopping street in Hong Kong. In 2014, it was noted as the most expensive luxury street in the world.

Russell Street is an east–west running street with two sections. It starts from Lee Garden Road, split by Matheson Street and Percival Street, and ends in Canal Road East. Russell Street is one of the most crowded streets in Hong Kong. The eastern section from (Lee Garden Road to Percival Street) was renovated and reopened as a full-time pedestrian street on 7 April 2000. It was the first pedestrian street in Hong Kong. The remaining section, from Matheson Street to Canal Road East, was also added to the scheme as a traffic-calming street later. Nearby are Times Square, a video wall, an MTR station, a cinema, many famous shops, taxi station.

== Name ==
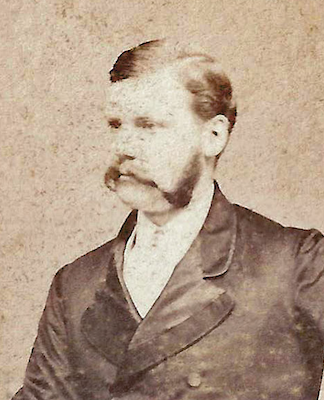
Sir James Russell

Russell Street was either named after Sir James Russell or after Russell & Company. Sir James Russell was a senior colonial official and Chief Justice of the Supreme Court of Hong Kong from 1888 to 1892. Russell, who was from Ulster, died at the early age of 50 in 1893. Following his death, the Hong Kong Daily News described Russell as: "one of the most hard working officials that the Hong Kong Civil Service has ever possessed, and with his industry were united great natural shrewdness and common sense."

== History ==
Russell Street used to be a traditional Chinese wet market where hawkers sold vegetables, fruits, meats and groceries. Dai pai dong (cooked-food stores) could also be found along the street. Due to the lack of hygiene and sanitation knowledge at that time, mice infestation was very serious in there—people even called Russell Street the "Mouse Street". The Jian family, in 1905, founded The Nanyang Brothers' Tobacco Co., based in Russell Street. Due to the intense rivalry with the monopoly, British American Tobacco company, the Jian family declared bankruptcy and closed the factory in 1908.

In 1904, Hong Kong Tramways built a tram depot by Russell Street, mainly for tram repair and parking. As the demand for tram service grew, the old Russell Street tram depot could no longer park all the trams Hong Kong Tramways owned. The company decided to expand the Russell Street depot, and at the same time built a temporary tram depot in North Point to ease tram parking problem. In 1951, Hong Kong Tramways finished the renovation of Russell Street depot, renamed it as Sharp Street depot. The North Point temporary tram depot was then closed. Not long after the expansion of the Russell Street tram depot, the Tramway workers resented Hong Kong Tramways for unjustifiable dismissal and break of employment contract, which eventually caused a labour dispute in 1952. In 1989, Lockhart Road market reconstruction completed. Hawkers and Dai Pai Dong on Russell Street all moved into the new Lockhart Road market. The Sharp Street depot (formerly Russell Street depot) was shut down and demolished. All trams were moved to Sai Wan Ho and Whitty Street depot. The site of Russell Street was then reconstructed into Times Square.

== 1952 Labor dispute ==
The tramways workers were initially seeking to end the new Condition of Services introduced by the Hong Kong Tramways. But the political elements eventually changed the focus to disputes between the management and unions with political background. In 1951, the Hong Kong government proposed that most of the workers' variable living allowance paid by their employers should be included as part of the basic wage. The Hong Kong Tramways then launched a new Condition of Services along with the new wage plan, stating that other than allowances, dismissal and retirement compensations would also be considered as part of the basic wage. Most of the workers were opposed to the new Condition of Services. The Hong Kong Tramway Workers' Union (HKTWU) even asked for mediation from the Labor Department with Hong Kong Tramways. The HKTWU, a member of the left-wing Hong Kong Federation of Trade Unions. After they announced their intention to mediate with Hong Kong Tramways through the Labour department, left-wing organisations and unions actively showed support to them. Considering the political background of HKTWU, the Hong Kong Tramways refused to attend mediation with HKTWU. Instead, they held a meeting with workers representatives, given that workers could not claim to be representatives of the HKTWU. These meetings went on for several months, and Hong Kong Tramways at last agreed to change mandatory participation in the new Condition of Services to voluntary-based participation. The Tramway workers gained success in the negotiation with Hong Kong Tramways, but HKTWU then requested recognition from Hong Kong Tramways, which turned the dispute into political means. The Hong Kong Tramways recognised another non-political Tramway workers' union, but refused to recognise the HKTWU, which led to discontents among HKTWU members and other left-wing organisations and unions. The conflict became more intense after three tramway workers were dismissed on 20 April 1952. The HKTWU met with Hong Kong Tramways, asking to restore the three workers' position. Many workers gathered outside the Russell Street tram depot, waiting for the result of the meeting. The meeting continued for two days. Two of the three workers were eventually reinstated.

== World's highest retail rents ==
In 2013, store frontage on this street was named the most expensive in the world at HK$21,700 or US$2,800 per square foot annually. However after the 2019–20 Hong Kong protests and the COVID-19 pandemic, rents fell by over 30%, and property owners struggled to find long-term tenants.

== Transportation ==
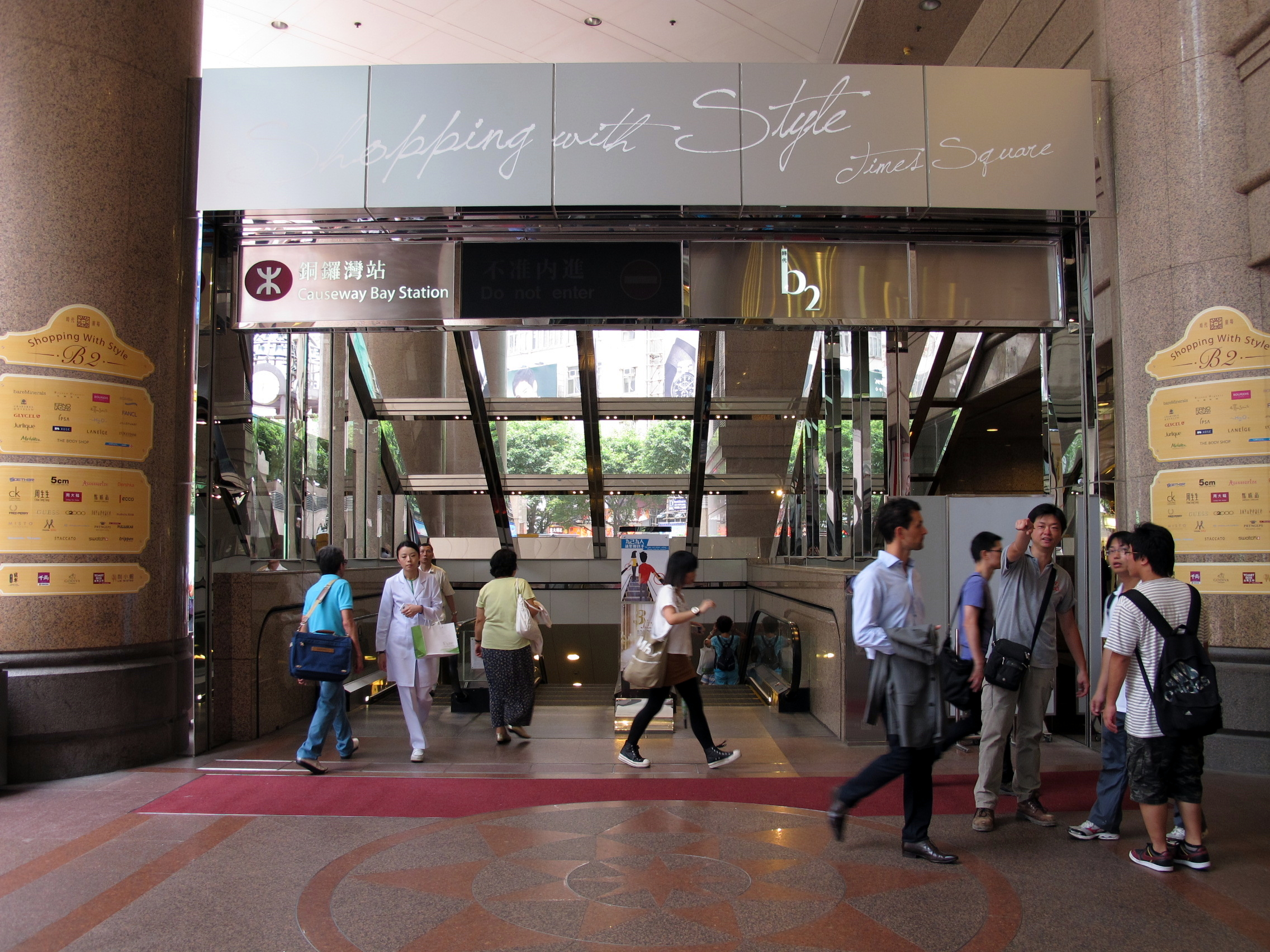
Causeway Bay station, Russell Street exit

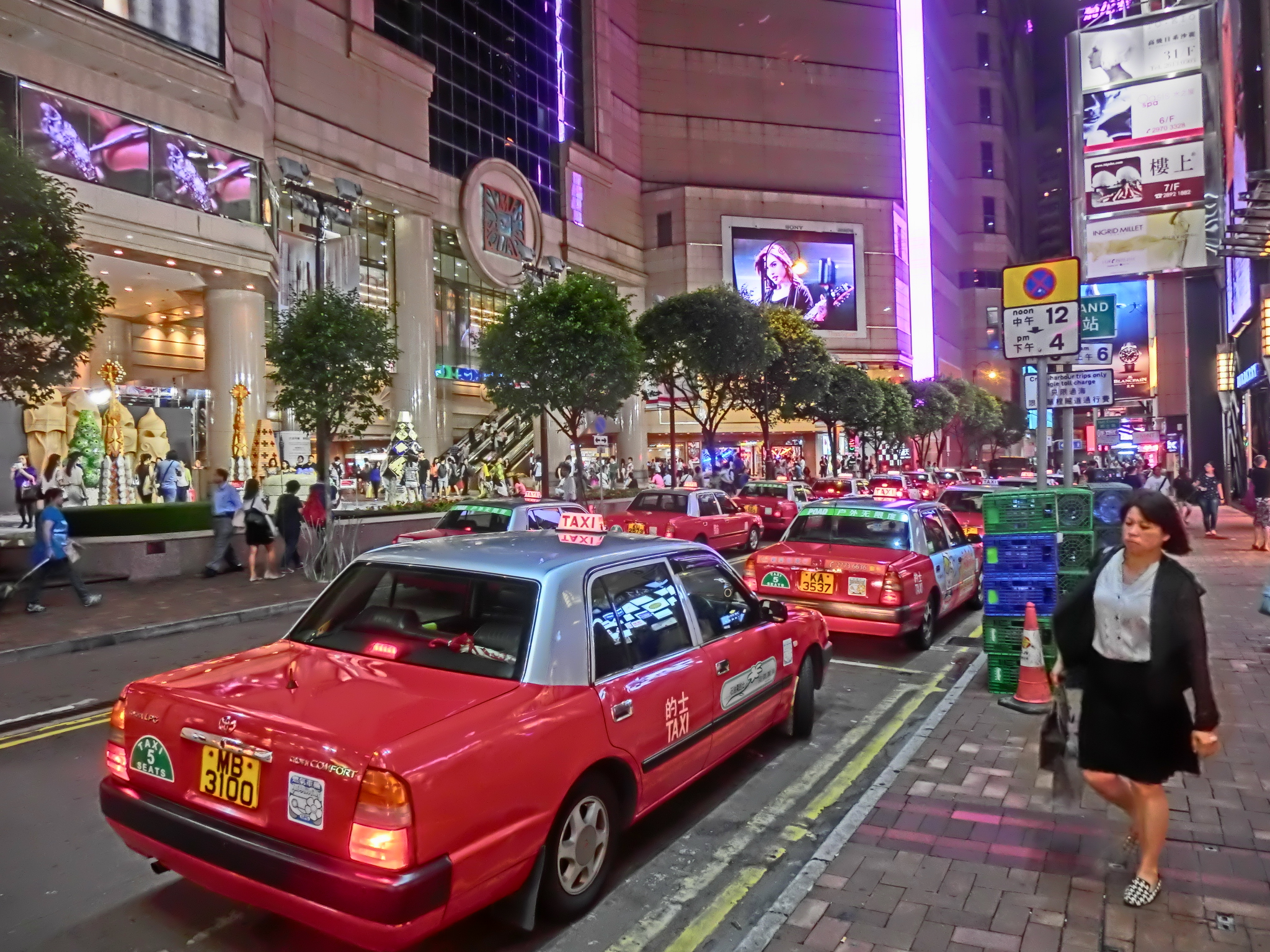
Taxi stand in Russell Street

=== MTR ===
The south concourse of Causeway Bay station is located in the Times Square basement. This concourse can only lead to Exit A, the entrance of Times Square at the intersection of Russell Street and Matheson Street.

=== Tram ===
Route 105, from Kennedy Town to Happy Valley Terminus, stops at the intersection of Percival Street and Foo Ming Street, which is only one block away from Russell Street. This route is operated by Hong Kong Tramways. Tram fare is HKD $2.60 per adult.

=== Bus ===
Canal Road East stop is located under Canal Road flyover, right across Russell Street. The Kowloon Motor Bus, Citybus, and New World First Bus run 15 routes via this stop.

== See also ==
- List of shopping streets and districts by city
