= Beijing Yintai Centre Tower 2 =

- Interactive map of the Beijing Yintai Centre Tower 2 area

General information
- Location: Beijing, China, 2 Jianguomenwai Street, Chaoyang District
- Coordinates: 39°54′22.1″N 116°27′10.3″E
- Construction started: 2002
- Completed: 2007
- Owner: Beijing Urban Construction Design Institute

Height
- Antenna spire: 250 m (820 ft)
- Top floor: 227 m (745 ft)

Technical details
- Floor count: 63 (+4 below-grade)
- Floor area: 113,000 m^{2} (1,220,000 sq ft)
- Lifts/elevators: 22

Design and construction
- Developer: Beijing Yintai Property
- Structural engineer: John Portman & Associates; LeMessurier Consultants
- Main contractor: Beijing Urban Construction Design Institute

Other information
- Parking: 1,672

Beijing Yintai Centre Tower 2 (simplified Chinese: 北京银泰中心 2; traditional Chinese: 北京銀泰中心 2; pinyin: Běijīng Yíntài Zhōngxīn Èr) is a 63-floor, 250 m (820 ft) tall skyscraper completed in 2007 located in Beijing Yintai Centre, Beijing, China. It includes a hotel and residences.

== See also ==
- List of tallest buildings in Beijing
