= Stephen Ng =

Hong Kong businessman

Stephen Tin-hoi Ng (Chinese:吳天海) (born 1953 in Hong Kong) is a Hong Kong entrepreneur, who is the chairman and the managing director of the Wharf (Holdings) Limited. He is the chairman and chief executive officer of i-Cable Communications. He is also the deputy chairman of Wheelock & Co, the chairman and chief executive officer of Wharf T&T, the chairman of Joyce Boutique, Modern Terminals and Harbour Centre Development.

Mr. Ng graduated from the Wah Yan College, Kowloon of Hong Kong, the Ripon College of the United States and the University of Bonn of Germany. He joined the Wharf in 1981 and became the Managing Director in 1989. He is the Chairman of the General Committee of Hong Kong General Chamber of Commerce for 2016–2018.
