= The Wharf (Holdings) =

Company in Hong Kong

The Wharf (Holdings) Limited 九龍倉集團有限公司
- Type: Public
- Traded as: SEHK: 4
- Industry: Logistics; Hotels; Real Estate; Telecommunications
- Founded: 1886; 140 years ago
- Headquarters: Kowloon, Hong Kong, China
- Area served: Hong Kong; Mainland China
- Key people: Peter Woo (chairman)
- Owner: Wheelock and Company
- Parent: Wheelock and Company
- Website: www.wharfholdings.com/en/

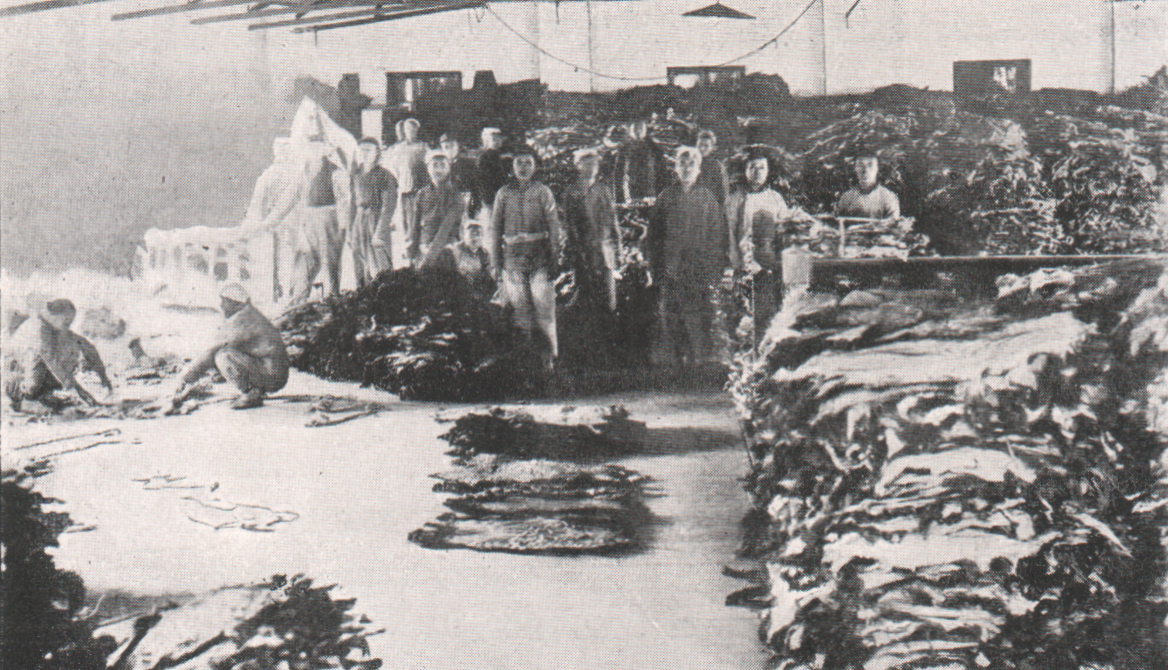
Fur warehouse of The Wharf, before 1912

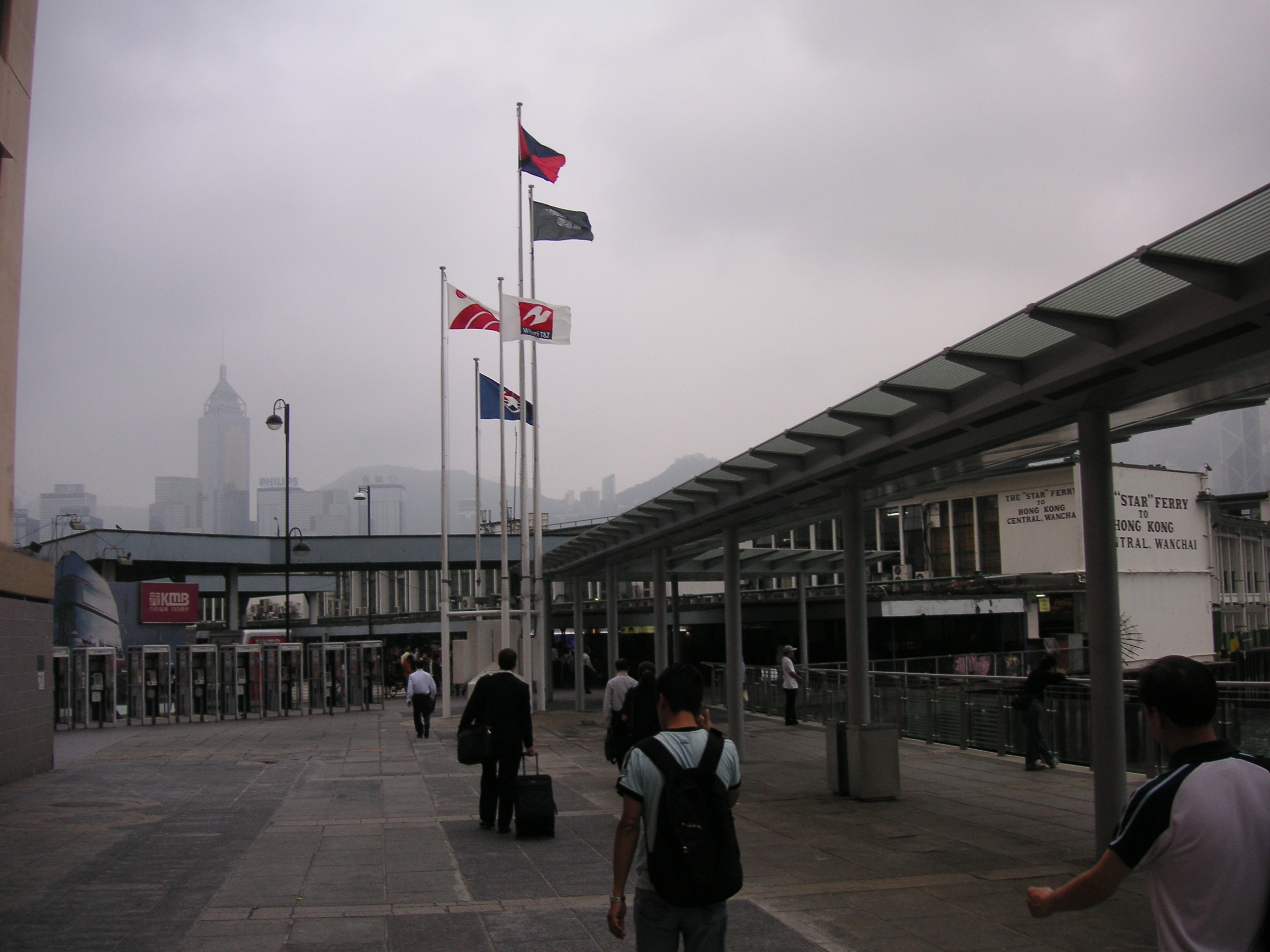
Five Flag Poles of the Wharf near Star Ferry Pier and Ocean Terminal. Five flags are of the Wharf, Harbour City, Cable TV, Wharf T&T and Star Ferry.

The Wharf (Holdings) Limited (Chinese: 九龍倉集團), or Wharf (九倉) in short, is a company founded in 1886 in Hong Kong. As its name suggests, the company's original business was in running wharfage and dockside warehousing, and it was originally known as The Hong Kong and Kowloon Wharf and Godown Company, Limited and founded by Sir Paul Chater. The company adopted its current name in 1986. The current major holder of the company is Wheelock & Co.

== History ==
The company is still the owner of the Star Ferry, although this icon of Hong Kong now forms a relatively small part of the company's portfolio. The Five Flag Poles, a set of flag poles flying flags of the company, are a short walk from the Star Ferry's Tsim Sha Tsui pier and form a local landmark and meeting point.

In a more modern vein, the company owns two major flagship properties in the Harbour City and Times Square shopping centres in Hong Kong. Both owe their origins to the company's transportation heritage, as they are respectively built on the site of the company's original wharf, and on the site of the original depot of the Hong Kong Tramway (owned 1974–2009), a former subsidiary.

Other holdings in Hong Kong include i-CABLE, Cable TV and WTT, and Modern Terminals. The company also holds many properties in the Tsim Sha Tsui area of Kowloon.

On 26 July 2016, it was announced that Wharf Holdings (through Novel Colour Limited, a wholly owned subsidiary) is investing RMB 150 million to form WWE & Company, a social mobile shopping platform technology company.

In 2017, The Wharf (Holdings) spun off its real estate portfolio as a sister listed company Wharf Real Estate Investment Company (Wharf REIC).

In February 2018, Wharf REIC replaced The Wharf (Holdings) as the component of the blue chip index Hang Seng Index.

In December 2020, the company was awarded a plot located on the Peak for $1.5 billion, marking the first sale of a parcel in the prestigious neighbourhood since 2011.

== Holdings ==
Wharf Hotels is a subsidiary that manages 17 hotels, as of 2022, in Mainland China, Hong Kong and the Philippines. Twelve of the hotels are under the Marco Polo Hotels brand and five are flagged under Niccolo Hotels.

== See also ==
- Star House
