= Beijing Yintai Centre =

Residential and commercial complex in central Beijing, China

Coordinates: 39°54′21″N 116°27′11″E

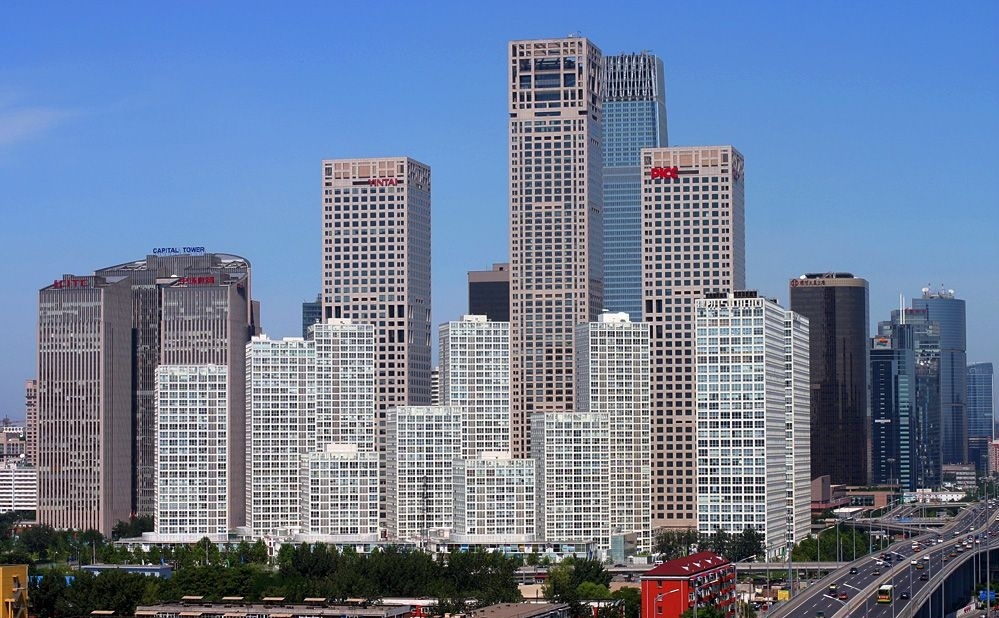
Beijing Yintai Centre

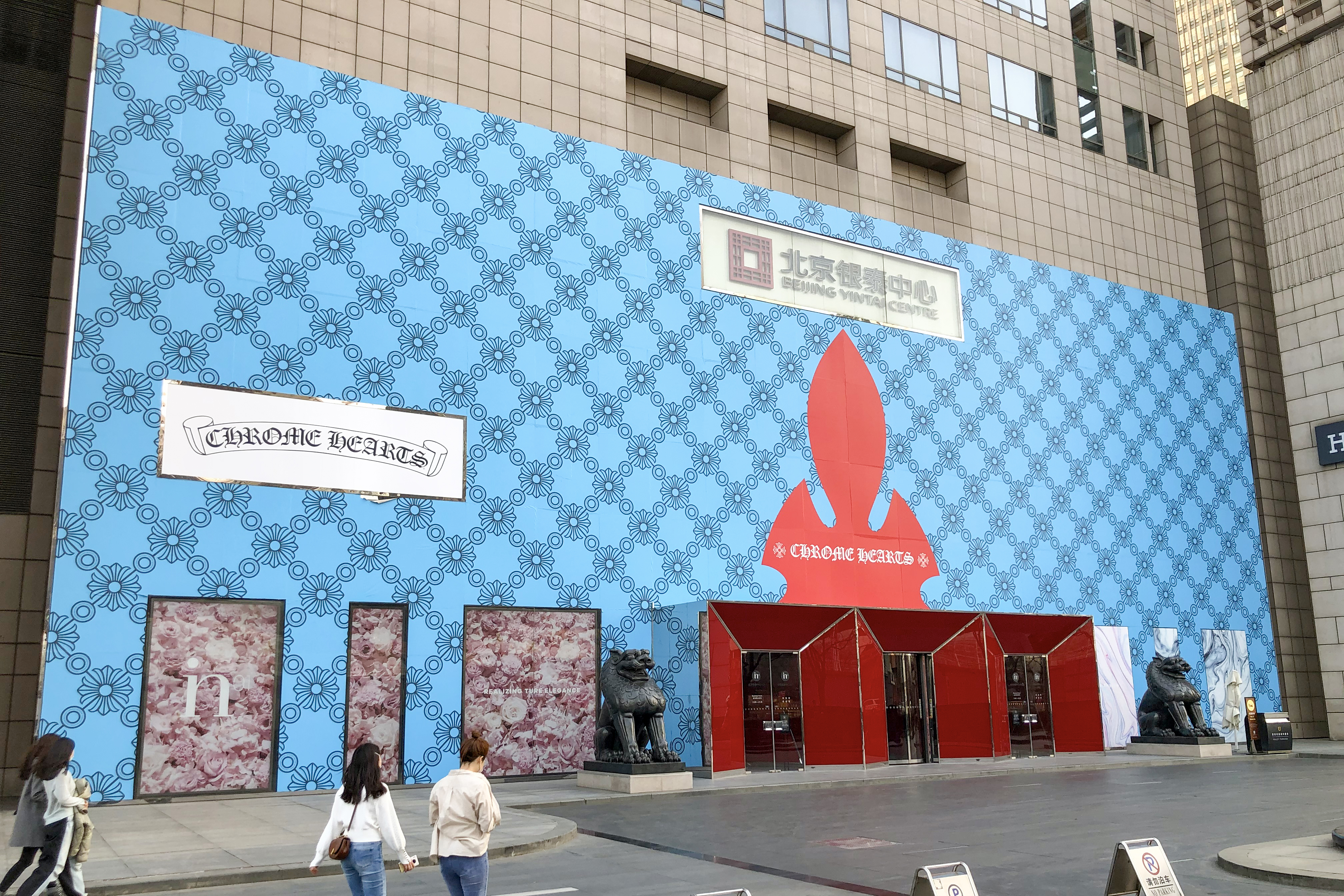
Entrance of Beijing Yintai Centre in01

Beijing Yintai Centre (simplified Chinese: 北京银泰中心; traditional Chinese: 北京銀泰中心; pinyin: Běijīng Yíntài Zhōngxīn) is located in the core of the Beijing central business district. It is a three-towered structure with the central tower rising 250 m high and the two flanking towers about 186 m. The central tower consists of Park Hyatt Beijing, penthouses and residences.

The project was designed by John Portman. Structural engineering was done by LeMessurier Consultants.

== See also ==
- Beijing Yintai Centre Tower 2
