= Times Square (Hong Kong) =

Shopping centre in Causeway Bay, Hong Kong

Coordinates: 22°16′42″N 114°10′56″E

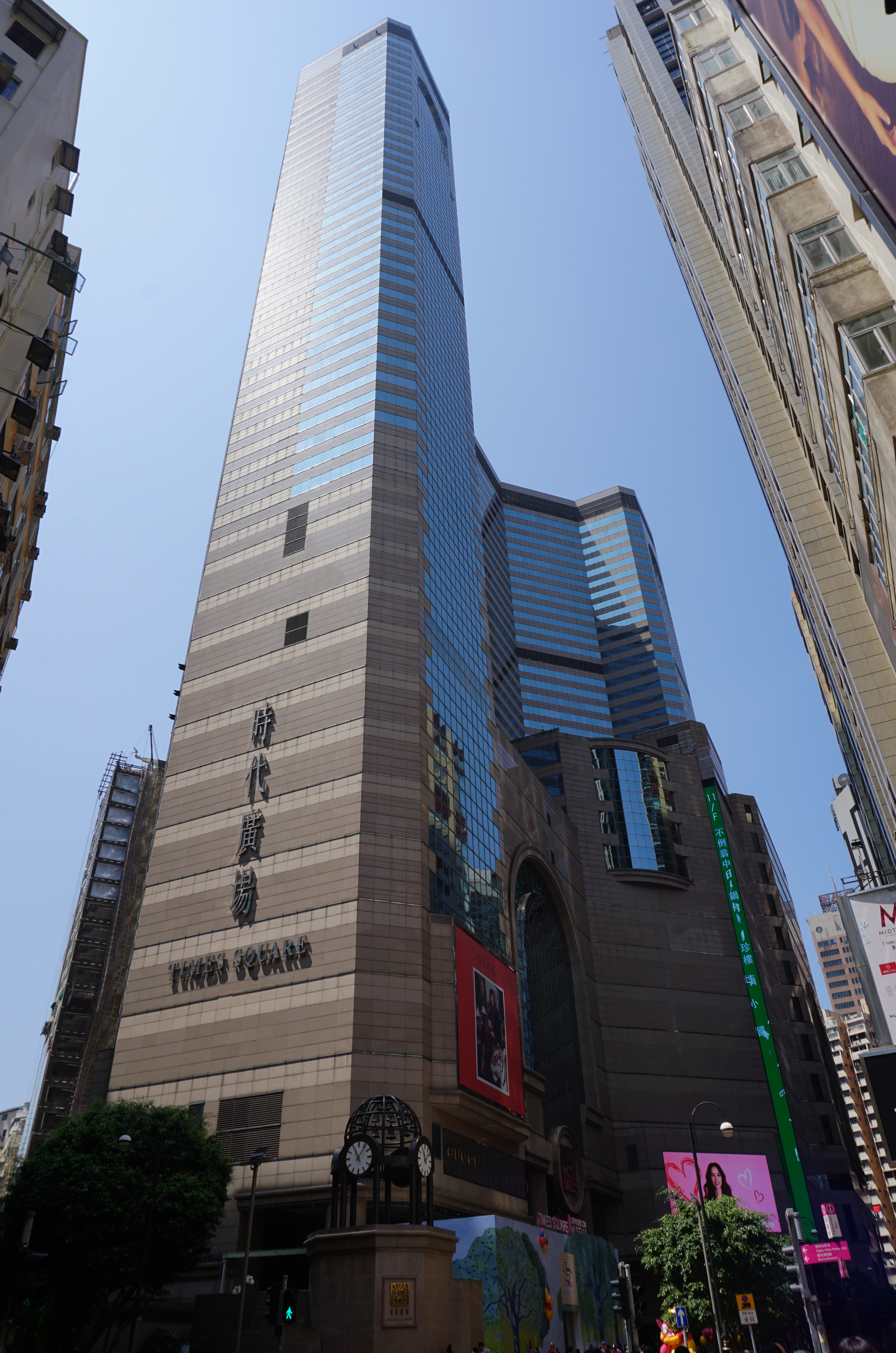
- Interactive map of the Times Square area

General information
- Location: 1 Matheson Street, Causeway Bay, Hong Kong Island, Hong Kong
- Opening: 13 April 1994; 32 years ago
- Owner: The Wharf (Holdings) Limited
- Operator: The Wharf (Holdings) Limited

Height
- Architectural: 193.9 m (636 ft) (Tower One); 168.8 m (554 ft) (Tower Two)

Technical details
- Floor count: 46 (Tower One); 39 (Tower Two)
- Floor area: 83,700 m^{2}

Design and construction
- Developer: The Wharf (Holdings) Limited

Other information
- Number of stores: 198

Website
- timessquare.com.hk

Times Square
- Traditional Chinese: 時代廣場
- Simplified Chinese: 时代广场
Transcriptions
Standard Mandarin
- Hanyu Pinyin: Shídài Guǎngchǎng
Yue: Cantonese
- Jyutping: si4 doi6 gwong2 coeng4

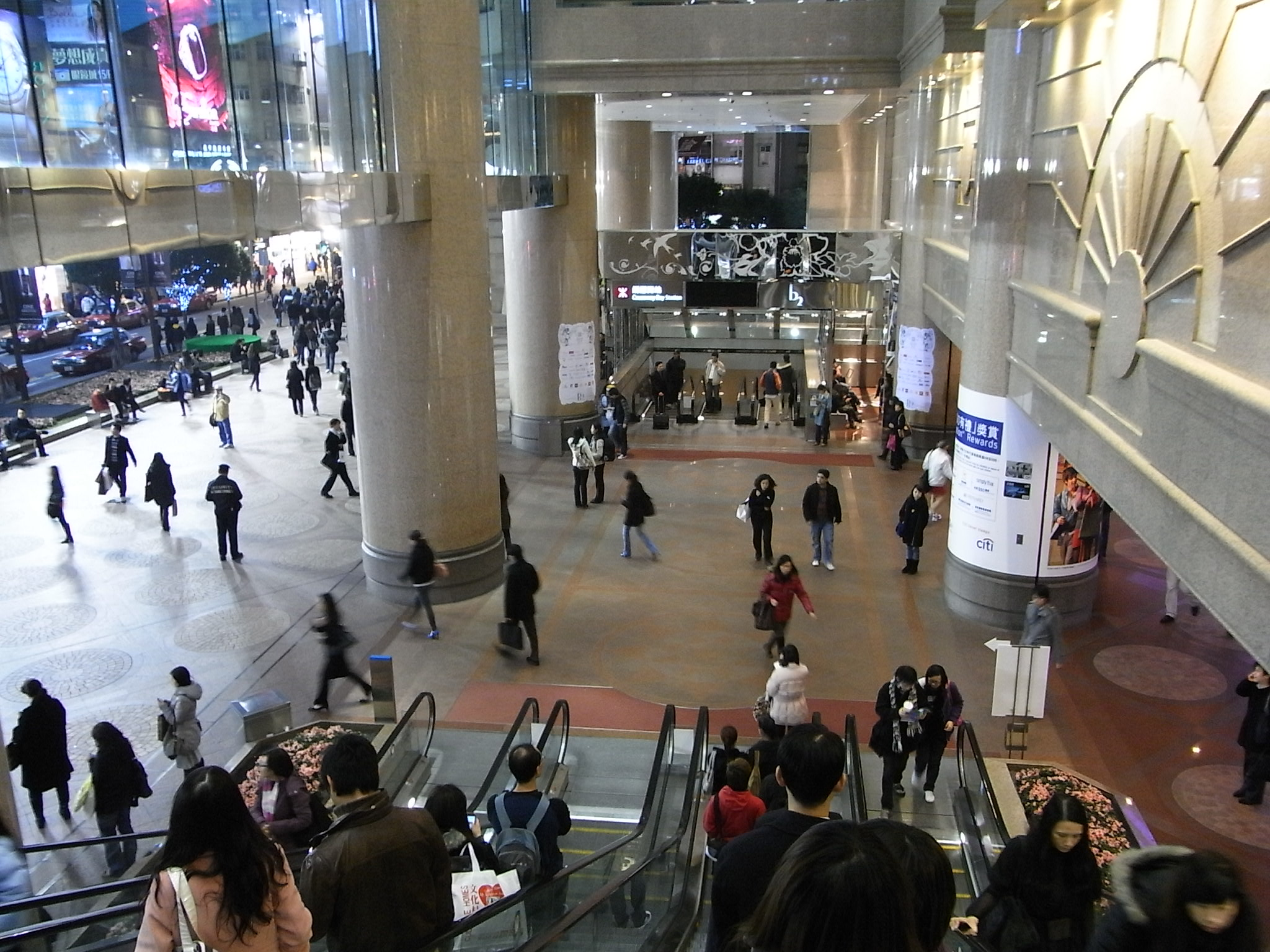
Entrance lobby of Times Square.

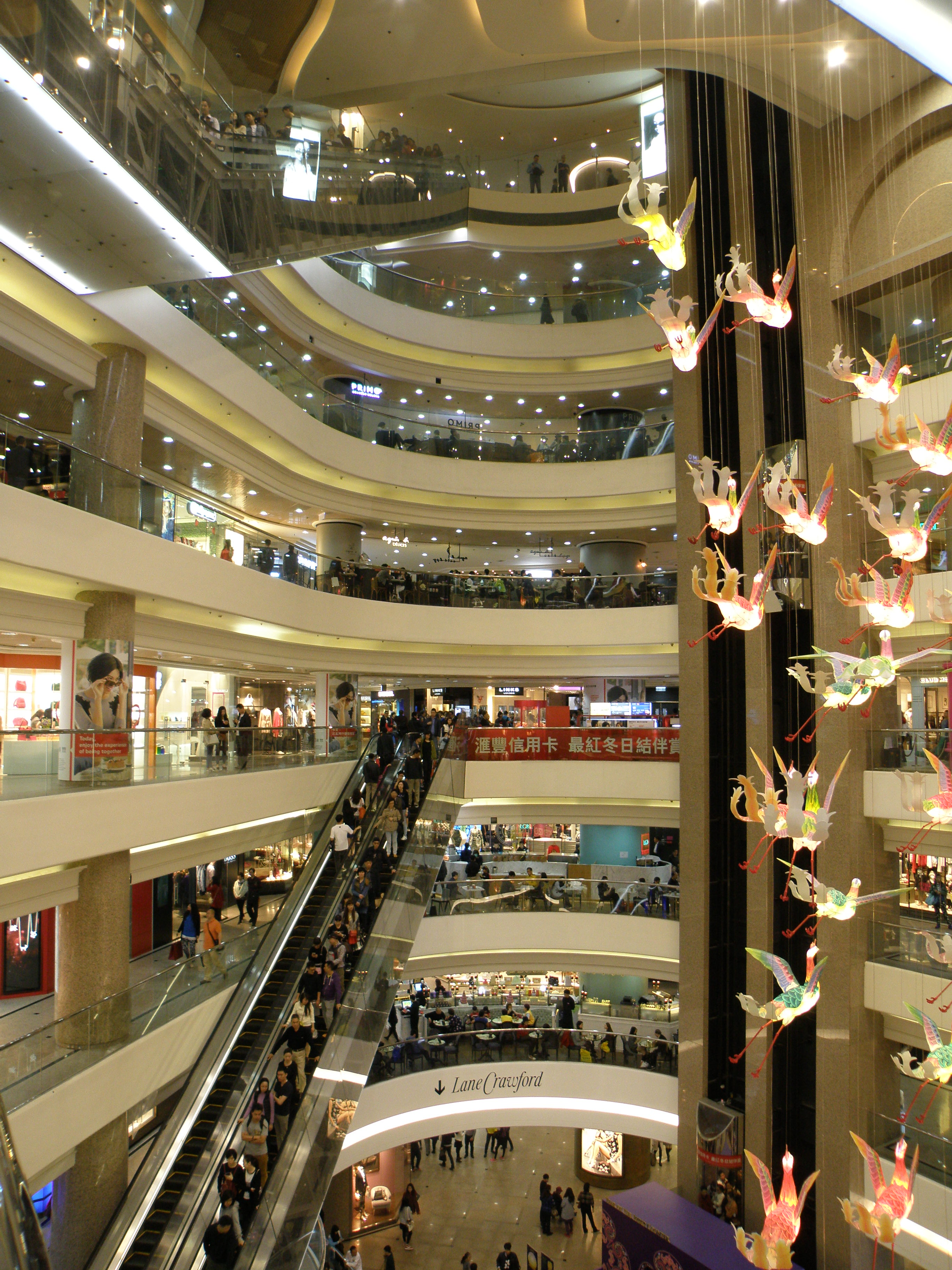
Time Square Main Atrium

Times Square (Chinese: 時代廣場) is a luxury shopping centre and office tower complex in Causeway Bay, Hong Kong. The complex, owned by Wharf Properties, part of The Wharf (Holdings) Limited group, opened on 13 April 1994.

== History ==
The site was previously occupied by the original Sharp Street tram depot of the Hong Kong Tramways, another of the Wharf's subsidiary operations acquired in 1974. The Executive Council approved Tramways' plan to relocate its depots to Sai Wan Ho and Sai Ying Pun in July 1986, on the argument that the HK$3.5 million in operating costs savings would allow for tram fares to be held down. Additionally the noise of maintenance and tram movements at night was said to have long been a nuisance to surrounding residential buildings.

The area was predominantly residential, and the Town Planning Board insisted that the project did not include any more residential space. In July 1987, Wharf unveiled draft plans to redevelop the site into 1,600,000-square-foot (148,600 m^{2}) of office and retail space. Following the relocation of Wanchai depot, the site was surrendered to its associate in 1988.

In 1991, the concrete plans were announced: the project would create 186,000 m^{2} of retail and office complex, an estimated construction cost of HK$ 2 billion.

At the time, the developer's debt levels and the uncertainty over sovereignty also rendered project financing more problematic. Now it is considered prime property in the heart of Causeway Bay.

== Project configuration ==
The project consists of 83,700 m^{2} of retail space, and two office towers with 102,300 m^{2} of accommodation.

=== Shopping centre ===
Times Square is considered the first of its kind, the first "vertical mall" in Hong Kong. Due to the high land price in Hong Kong, and the higher yield on retail property, Times Square departs from the common western model of the flat shopping mall. The space allocated to retail is configured over 9 storeys. The mall and lifts to the office tower are accessible by long escalators linking the ground floor podium and the first level of the mall. The ground floor features Hong Kong's only spiral escalator.

In 2015, the newly refurbished shopping centre was completed, with new express escalators inserted into the tall atrium and reconfiguration of service and car park access to facilitate a new anchor store.

The anchors of the shopping centre are Lane Crawford and city'super.

Emperor Cinemas renovated the UA Cine Times Cinema at Times Square in Causeway Bay and opened for business at the end of 2021.

=== Office buildings ===
It is common practice for owners to allow naming buildings after its important tenants and giving illusion of ownership. The entire complex remains owned by Wharf, but western and eastern office towers of the complex have been named "Shell Tower" and "Tower One" respectively. Both towers were designed by the architect firm Wong & Ouyang.

- Tower One: NatWest Tower: NatWest Tower rises 193.9 m (636 ft) tall and 46 floors. It is the 74th-tallest building in Hong Kong.
- Tower Two: Shell Tower: Shell Tower is 168.8 m (554 ft) tall and 39 floors.

Tenants of Tower Two:

- Google Hong Kong: Suite 2501

== Christmas and New Year celebrations ==
Mirroring the ball drop event hosted by its namesake in New York City, the plaza in front of the building formerly hosted New Year's Eve festivities, in which an apple was "dropped" approaching midnight via 22 m (72 ft) of signage. The event was held from 1993 to 2014; in 2015, Times Square discontinued the event in favour of an afternoon concert series over the holiday season.

== Public open space controversy ==
Under the terms of a Deeds of Dedication signed with the Government, 3,010 square metres (32,400 ft^{2}) of the ground floor was set aside for public access, pedestrian passage and passive recreation. However, the company has the right to organise exhibitions there, and charge fees. The exact details of the concessions to the developers were not made public.

Between July 2003 and March 2005, a corner of the piazza was leased to Starbucks Coffee. The company claimed it was an "unintentional oversight" that was quickly corrected after notification was received from the Buildings Department.

In 2008, controversy was again sparked following complaints that private security guards attempted to stop people lingering in the public area, and building management apologised for their "over-zealous" guards. Since then, there has been a wider campaign in Hong Kong to re-examine provisions for public open space, and the government quid pro quo with property developers. Alan Leong lamented the poor quality of some of Hong Kong's public open spaces, and said he hoped that a Legco review would result in a "more transparent and predictable system".

The Secretary for Justice, filed a writ in the High Court on behalf of the Government against Times Square Ltd and its parent company Wharf Group, seeking to recover rental fees of as much as HK$124,000 a day for use of the Causeway Bay piazza dating back to 1993. Commentators describe it as a landmark lawsuit which may have significant implications for other property owners if it is successful.

The company believes that it has not charged more than what is allowed in the deed, but welcomed the case saying it would ultimately provide guidance on the proper interpretation of the relevant clauses in the deed of dedication concerned.

== Transport ==
Times Square is served by Causeway Bay station of the Mass Transit Railway (MTR) system. There is an underground passage which directly links the building, and exit A1 opens into the ground floor podium level.

It is also accessible by tram in the direction to Happy Valley or Shau Kei Wan. Lastly it is served by various bus and minibus routes.

There is also a taxi stand that is strategically positioned outside the main entrance of Times Square in Causeway Bay.

== Cultural reference ==
The Times Square Marketplace Mall was featured in the 2003 film Lara Croft: Tomb Raider – The Cradle of Life where a department store that is marked as "closed for renovation" is secretly hiding a biological weapons production plant.

== See also ==
- List of tallest buildings in Hong Kong
