= Lam Chi-fung =

Lam Chi-fung (Chinese: 林子豐)

Founding President of Hong Kong Baptist College
- In office 1956-3 – 1971-4
- Preceded by: N/A
- Succeeded by: Daniel Tse, Ph.D.

Personal details
- Born: November 6, 1892 Jieyang County, Guangdong Province, Qing Dynasty China
- Died: April 17, 1971 (aged 78) Hong Kong Baptist Hospital, Kowloon Tong, British Hong Kong
- Profession: Businessmen, school principals church leader

Lam Chi-fung, also written as "Lam Tze Fung", "Lin Zifeng" or "Chi-fung Lam" (Chinese: 林子豐, 1892 – 1971), OBE, was a Hong Kong banker, Baptist educator and philanthropist. He founded Ka Wah Bank in 1922, served as the principal of Pui Ching Middle School from 1950 to 1965, the founding principal of Hong Kong Baptist College from 1956 to 1971, and the chairman of the Baptist Convention of Hong Kong from 1941 to 1971.

== Early life ==
Lam Chi-fung was born on November 6, 1892 in Jinkeng, Jieyang County, Guangdong Province of China. His father, Lam Shiu‑fun (Chinese: 林紹勳), was a primary school teacher in the countryside and later became a Baptist pastor. Growing up in a Christian family, Lam Chi-fung became a Christian at the age of 14. He attended Jieyang Zhenli Baptist Middle School in his early years and later transferred to Queshi Middle School in Shantou. After graduating from middle school, he went to Peking Union Medical College in 1911 to study medicine, but soon returned to Tongwen Academy in Xiamen to study foreign languages and commerce. After completing his studies, Lam returned to his hometown.

== Banking and business career ==
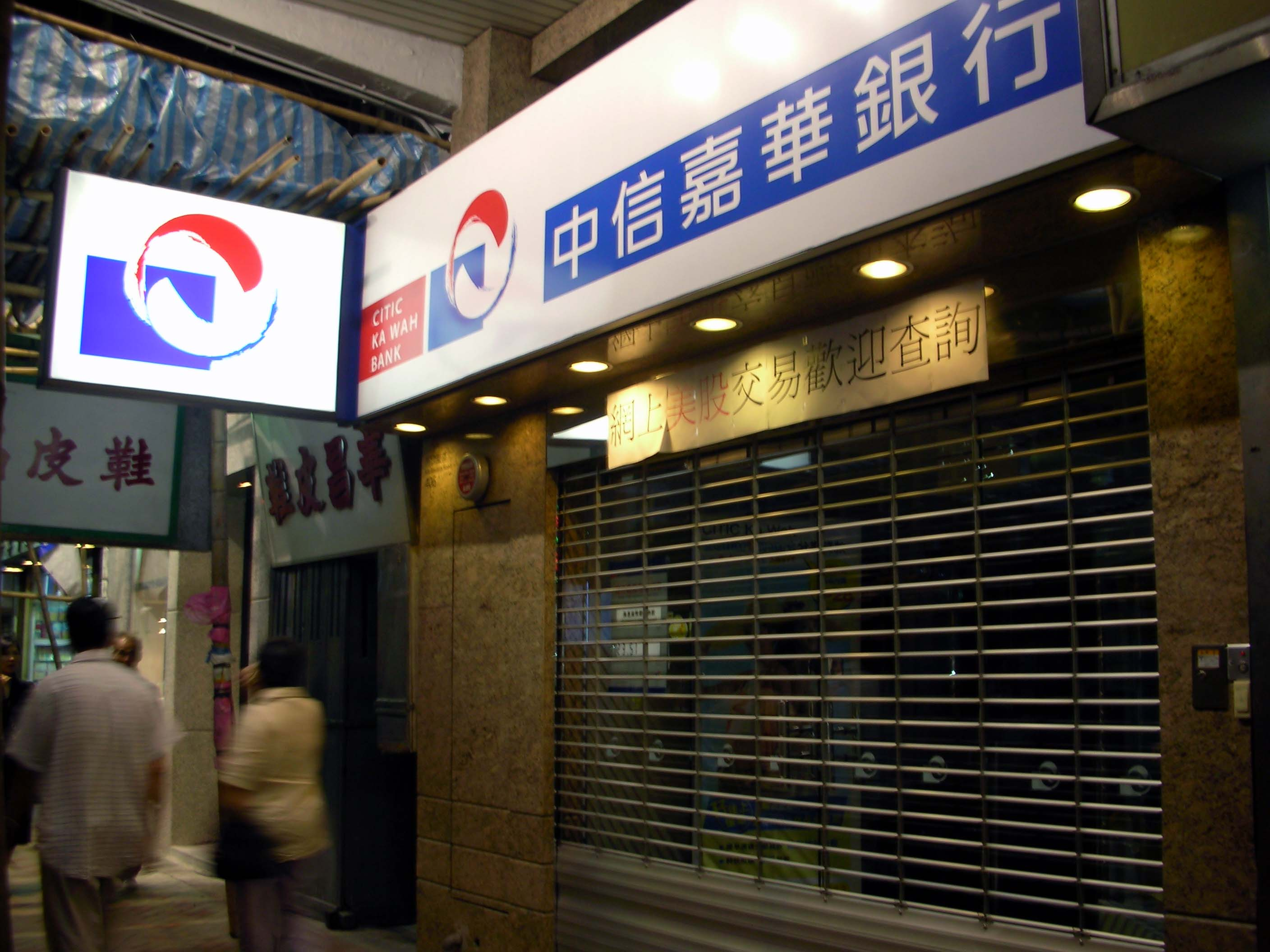
The Ka Wah Bank, founded by Lam Chi-fung, has changed its name many times. The image shown is of CITIC Ka Wah Bank Limited from 1998 to 2010

In 1916, Lam Chi-fung, who knew English, was hired by his uncle to work as an English clerk at Guangyuan Shengxing, a rice company in Chaoshan. He was sent to Hong Kong to help the rice company expand its market and was soon promoted to manager. Later, Lam established Siwei Company and served as its general manager. He imported and acted as an agent for Vietnamese anthracite coal and ventured into the rice industry and shipping. In 1926, he co-founded Zhongyi Shipping Company with Chaoshan businessman Chen Zizhao and others. Its business covered Macau, Guangzhou, Zhanjiang, Shantou and Vietnam. It is understood that the mother of entrepreneur Fok Ying-tung was helped by Lam Chi-fung in her early years due to poverty. He hired her to transport coal from Vietnam to the shore, thereby earning commissions to help support her family.

After Lam Chi-fung's trading business stabilized, he saw an opportunity to expand into the banking industry. On February 2, 1922, he founded Ka Wah Bank (or "Jia Hua Bank" in Pinyin) in Guangzhou. The bank was initially operated by shareholders of Jia Nan Tang and Nan Hua Company, invited by Lam, hence the name. In 1924, Lam moved the head office of the Bank to Des Voeux Road Central in Central, Hong Kong, with a capital of HK$500,000. By 1931, he had opened a branch in Shanghai, increasing the capital to HK$1 million, and the business expanded rapidly. However, later, due to political turmoil and Japan's invasion of China, Lam was forced to close the branches in Shanghai and Guangzhou in 1935 due to economic instability. Despite this, as a well-known Teochew businessman in Hong Kong, Lam was elected president of the Hong Kong Teochew Chamber of Commerce from 1937 to 1939. Furthermore, through his influence in Vietnam, he helped facilitate the signing of Part B of the Sino-French Vietnam Commercial Treaty between the Nationalist government of China and the French government of Vietnam in 1935, and was subsequently awarded the Order of the Dragon and the Star by the Vietnamese Royal Family in 1936 in recognition of this achievement. However, after the outbreak of World War II in 1939, Lam's banking business was severely impacted, and all operations ceased after the outbreak of the Pacific War in December 1941 and the fall of Hong Kong. It was not until after the liberation of Hong Kong in 1945 that Ka Wah Bank reopened in Hong Kong, and subsequently changed its name to "Ka Wah Bank Limited" in January 1949.

After the war, Lam continued to serve as Chairman of Ka Wah Bank, and the banking business developed steadily. At the same time, in 1947 he founded the Jee Ho Manufacturing Plant, which mainly produced flashlights, and later established Chi Fung Properties Limited, serving as Chairman of both companies. In the 1950s, Lam began to withdraw from his business and focused on church and education work. He gradually handed over the family business to his sons, Lin Sixian and Lin Sijin, but he remained chairman of three companies: Ka Wah Bank, Jehwa Manufacturing Plant and Chi Fung Properties, until his death. Later, the controlling stake in Ka Wah Bank fell into the hands of an American consortium and in 1974 it fell into the hands of Liu Cansong, a Singaporean businessman. In 1986, Ka Wah Bank, which was in financial crisis, received capital injection from CITIC Group to get out of trouble and was renamed "CITIC Ka Wah Bank" in 1998. In 2002, CITIC Ka Wah Bank acquired Hong Kong Chinese Bank under the planning of CITIC Group. In the same year, CITIC Ka Wah Bank was renamed "CITIC International Financial Holdings Limited", while Hong Kong Chinese Bank, which was acquired by it, was renamed "CITIC Ka Wah Bank Limited'. The Lam family completely withdrew from Ka Wah Bank business. In May 2010, CITIC Ka Wah Bank Limited was further renamed "CITIC Bank International", and the name "Ka Wah" officially became history.

== Baptist ministry and public welfare ==
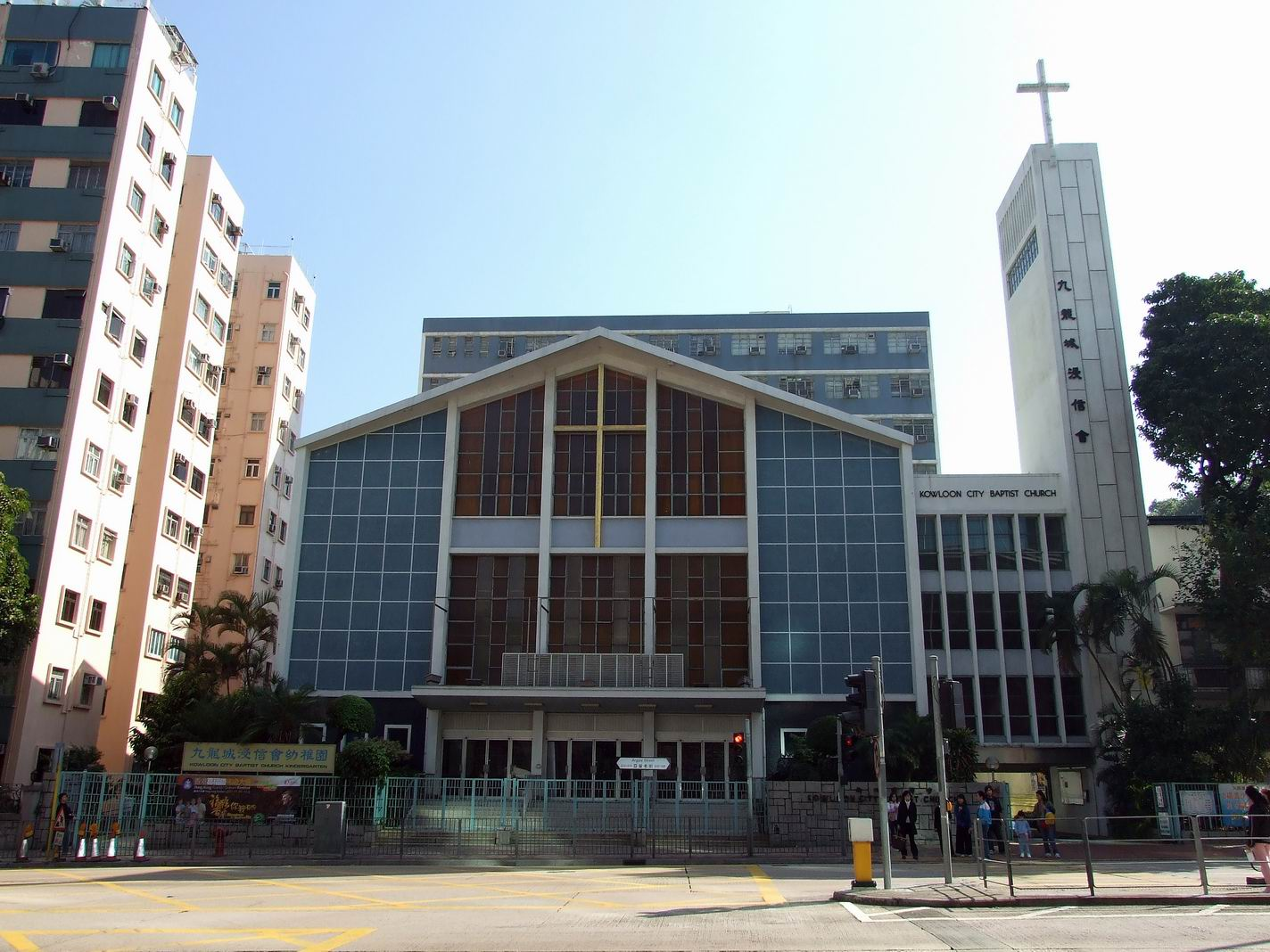
Lam Chi-fung served as the chairman of the board of directors of Kowloon City Baptist Church for life from 1939. The church in the picture was built with a donation of HK$120,000 from Lam Chi-fung and his wife in 1962.

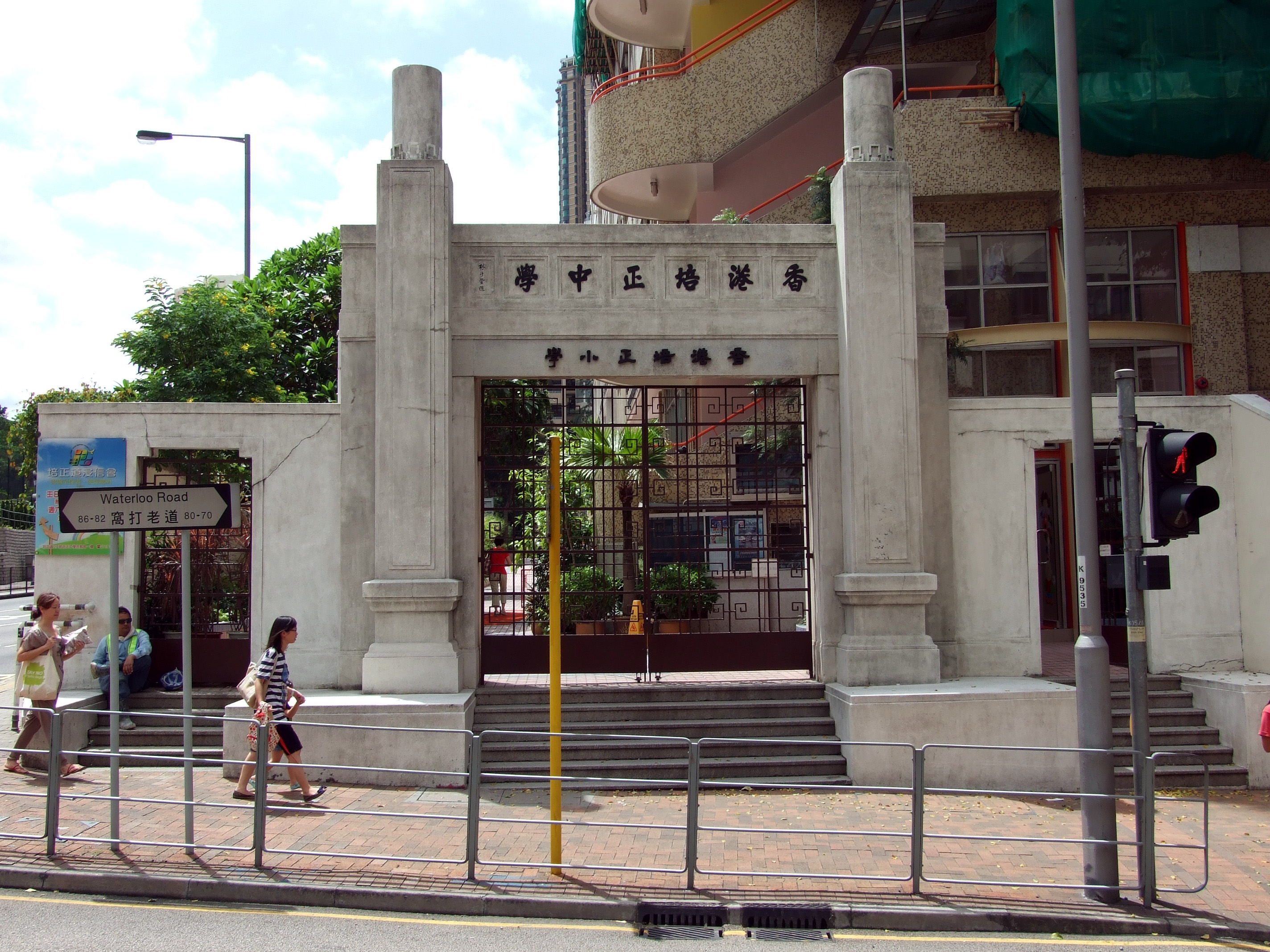
Lam Chi-fung served as the principal of Pui Ching Middle School in Hong Kong from 1950 to 1965 (pictured). He also served as the supervisor of both Pui Ching Middle Schools in Hong Kong and Macau.

Lam Chi-fung's family were devout Christians. In his early years, he was a member of Caine Road Baptist Church and presided over the work of the church's finance department and mission department. In 1938, he moved his family from Hong Kong Island to a mansion on Ka Lam Road in Kowloon City. The following year, he participated in the founding of Kowloon City Baptist Church. In addition to becoming the first deacon of the church with his wife, he also served as the chairman of the board of directors for life. Lam and his wife have been very concerned about the development of Kowloon City Baptist Church for many years. In 1962, the couple donated HK$120,000 to support the construction of the new Kowloon City Baptist Church. In addition to his work at Kowloon City Baptist Church, Lam participated in the founding of the Po Kong Gospel Church in 1938 and was elected chairman of the board of directors. The church was specifically set up for Christians from Chaozhou and was later reorganized into the Kowloon City Chaozhou Baptist Church. In March of the same year, the Hong Kong Baptist Convention was established, and Lam was invited to serve as one of the executive committee members, responsible for presiding over wartime relief work. From 1941, he also served as chairman of the Baptist Convention for life, guiding the development of the Hong Kong Baptist Church and witnessing the rapid expansion of Baptist Church affairs in Hong Kong after World War II. In addition, Lam was a director of the Chinese YMCA of Hong Kong from 1930 to 1932, and later served as president of the YMCA from 1933 to 1934 and from 1939 to 1956. During this period, he also served as the Hong Kong chairman of the YMCA's military service corps in Guangdong and Hong Kong in 1938, and briefly served as the general secretary of the YMCA in 1947. After stepping down as president of the YMCA in 1956, he was invited to serve as honorary president until 1959.

Lam hi-fung, who was enthusiastic about church ministry, also actively participated in social welfare. In 1935, he funded the construction of an irrigation canal for his hometown, Jieyang County. During World War II, in addition to presiding over relief work through the church, he also responded to the call of the Nationalist government in 1940 to raise funds for national salvation bonds in Hong Kong and Macau. He eventually raised more than 2 million yuan in legal tender. In the same year, he was awarded a plaque with the inscription "Loyalty and Righteousness" by the Nationalist government to express gratitude. During his time in Macau, he was invited by the Portuguese government of Macau to serve as a standing committee member of the Macau Food Control Committee and a member of the International Refugee Relief Committee to assist the authorities in dealing with the challenges of a large influx of refugees into the area during the war. After the liberation of Hong Kong in 1945, at the request of Sir John Harker, the then head of the British Provisional Military Government, Lam brought a large amount of anthracite coal, which he was acting as an agent for, from Macau to Hong Kong to help solve the problem of insufficient coal supplies in the market. In the early years after the war, Lam also paid attention to the housing shortage in Hong Kong. At that time, a large number of refugees from mainland China fled to Hong Kong to escape the Chinese Civil War. Most of them lived in wooden shacks built on the hillside, and the living and sanitary conditions were very poor. In January 1950, a fire broke out in the wooden shack area of Tung Tau Village in Kowloon City, destroying 6,000 wooden shacks and leaving 20,000 people homeless. Since the Hong Kong government did not have a comprehensive public housing policy at the time, Lam participated in the establishment of the Hong Kong and Kowloon Joint Relief Committee for Refugees from the Kowloon City Fire and donated HK$1,000 to help the victims. During this period, he repeatedly appealed to the public to donate money for disaster relief work on the radio in his capacity as president of the YMCA of China. Later, he served as vice chairman of the Kowloon City Fire Reconstruction Committee and participated in the construction subcommittee of the committee. Finally, the "Po Oi Village" was established on the original site to resettle the victims. The "Po Oi Village" was later reorganized by the Hong Kong government and became part of the Tung Tau bungalow area.

== Education and hospital ==
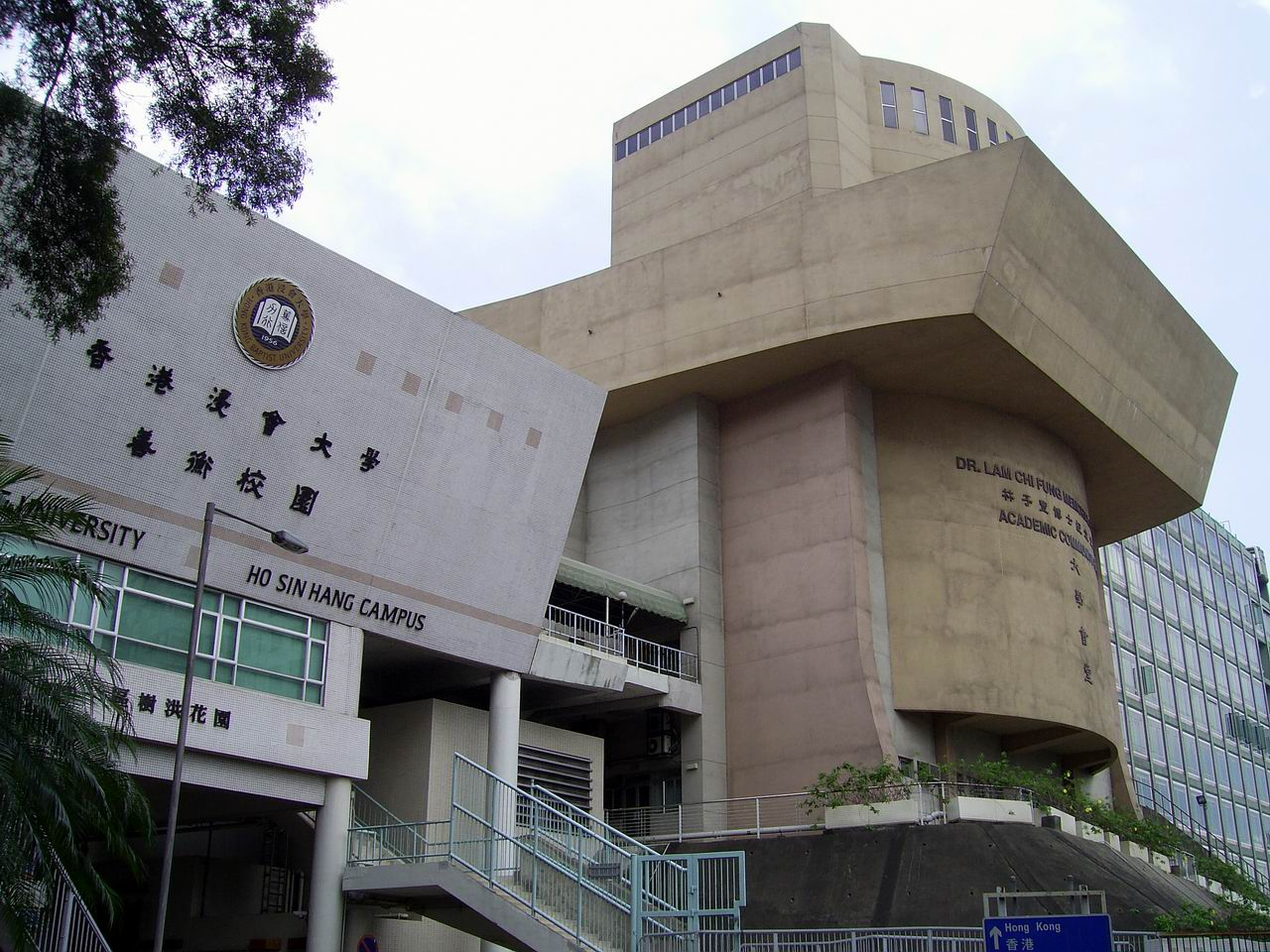
Lam Chi-fung founded Hong Kong Baptist College in 1956 and served as its principal until his death in 1971. Baptist College is the predecessor of Hong Kong Baptist University (pictured).

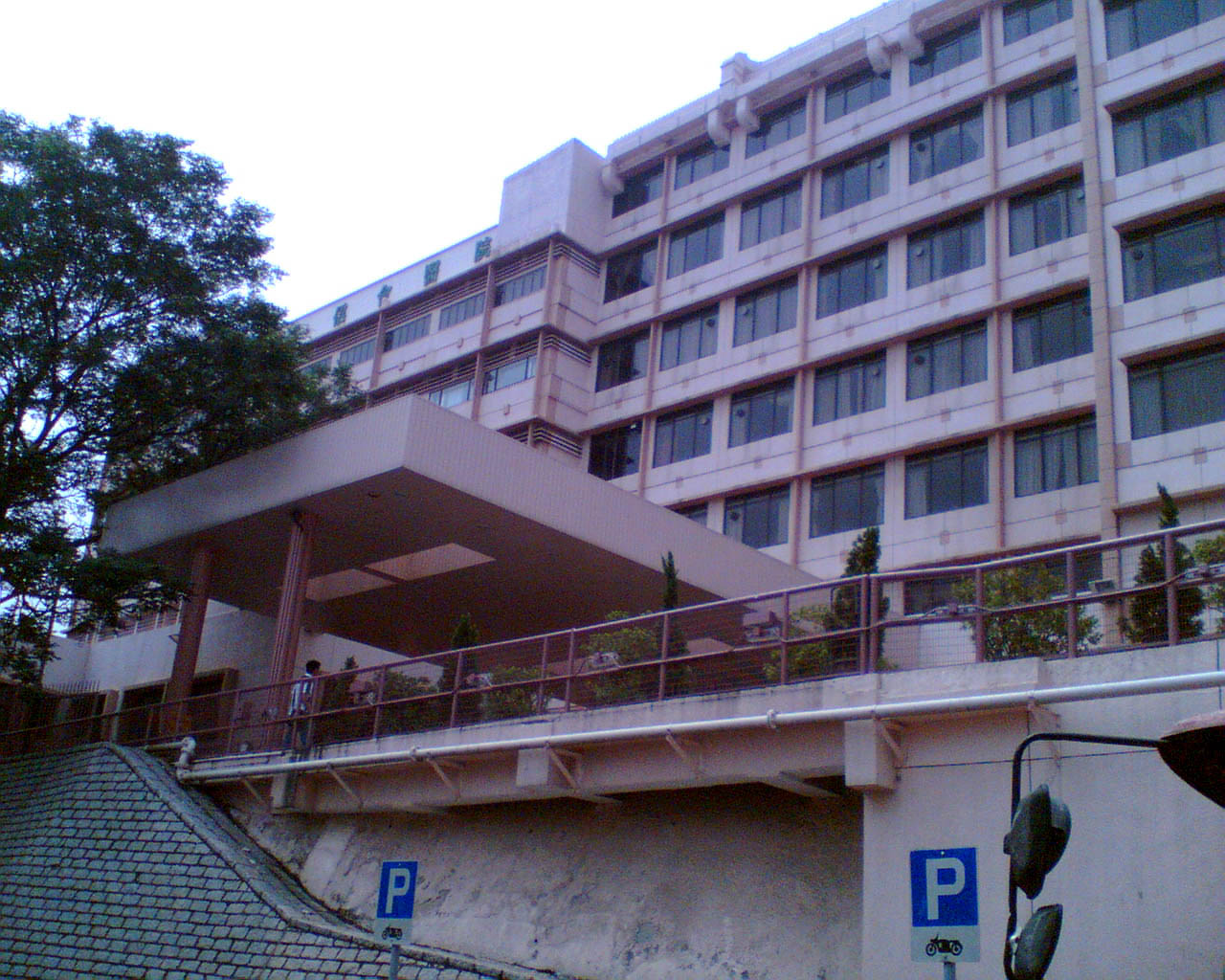
Lam Chi-fung founded Hong Kong Baptist Hospital in 1963.

Lam Chi-fung was also very active in education. As early as the 1930s, he served as a director of the Guangzhou Baptist Pui Ching Middle School. In 1933, he helped the school find land in Ho Man Tin, Hong Kong to build a school building as Hong Kong Pui Ching Primary School. Later, in 1935, the junior secondary school was opened. After Hong Kong fell to the Japanese in 1941, Lam Chi-fung fled to neutral Macau to avoid Japanese rule. Although he was forced to interrupt many of his businesses, he did not forget his work in the church and schools. In 1944, he agreed to serve as the principal of both Pui Ching Middle School in Macau and Pui To Girls' Middle School in Guangzhou, which had moved to Macau, to help the two schools get through the difficult days of war. During this period, he also helped many teachers and students who were in distress. After the war, Lam returned to Hong Kong to reorganize the Baptist education work. He took the lead in 1946 as the principal, director and supervisor of Pui To Middle School in Hong Kong, and helped to win the Hong Kong government to allocate land for the construction of school buildings. In 1950, he was invited to serve as the principal of Pui Ching Middle School in Hong Kong on a voluntary basis. During his tenure, he successfully lobbied the Hong Kong government's Education Secretary, Ko Sze-ya, to grant a large plot of land adjacent to the original school building for expansion. When the new school building, Block E, was completed and opened in 1953, Sir Alexander Grantham, then Governor of Hong Kong, was invited to preside over the key opening ceremony. Lam served as the principal of Pui Ching Middle School in Hong Kong for 15 years and concurrently served as the supervisor from 1958 to 1959. During this period, the school received a lot of donations from all walks of life and made great progress in school affairs. The number of students in the primary and secondary sections reached several thousands, making it one of the top Chinese schools in Hong Kong. After stepping down as principal in 1965, he was invited to serve as the supervisor of Pui Ching Middle School in Hong Kong for one year until 1966, and also served as the supervisor of Pui Ching Middle School in Macau from 1963 to 1970. In addition, Lam Chi-fung also served as a member of the board of directors of Kowloon City Min Sheng School from 1926, and served as the supervisor and chairman of the board of directors from May 1955.

Lam Chi-fung's concern for education led to his invitation to serve as vice president of the Chinese Society of the University of Hong Kong in 1951, his election as the first Chinese president of the Hong Kong Teachers' Association in 1952, and his appointment as a member of the Hong Kong Government's Education Committee in 1954. In 1951, Lam Chi-fung was also appointed by the Hong Kong Government as a member of the Hong Kong Higher Education Advisory Committee to participate in the review of the development of higher education in Hong Kong, which led to the publication of the "Jackson Report" in 1952. Although the report believed that Hong Kong only needed one University, it welcomed the establishment of more tertiary institutions, laying the groundwork for Lam Chi-fung's later proposal to establish a Baptist tertiary institution. In 1955, Lam Chi-fung, advocating the promotion of the Baptist school spirit, formally proposed to the Baptist Association to establish a Baptist tertiary college, and he served as one of the members of the preparatory committee of Hong Kong Baptist College. After the Baptist College was officially established on March 5, 1956, he served as its principal on a voluntary basis until his death in 1971. In the early years of the school's establishment, due to the inability to find land for school buildings, Baptist College had to borrow the school buildings of Pui Ching Middle School in Hong Kong for teaching. In 1959, the Governor of Hong Kong, Sir John Blake, finally agreed to grant a piece of land on Waterloo Road in Kowloon Tong as the permanent school site. The new school site was subsequently completed and put into use in 1966. To provide the college with a venue for ceremonies, Lam Chi-fung donated HK$500,000 to build a tertiary hall in 1970 to celebrate his golden wedding anniversary with his wife. However, the hall was not completed until May 1978, seven years after Lam Chi-fung's death.

In addition to the Baptist College, the Baptist Federation, considering that the Guangzhou Liangguang Baptist Theological Seminary was forced to close in 1950 due to political changes, studied the establishment of a seminary in Hong Kong. The idea received strong support from Lam Chi-fung, who served as the chairman of the preparatory committee for the Baptist Theological Seminary. After the Hong Kong Baptist Theological Seminary was officially established in 1951, he continued to serve as the chairman of the board of directors and the head of the theological department. The seminary was originally located in Pok Oi Village, Kowloon City. It was later moved to Ho Man Tin Hill Road in 1959, and then to Sai O, north of Sai Kung, in 1999. In addition, in 1952, the Baptist Church advocated the establishment of a Baptist clinic to serve the public, and elected Dr. Lam Si-on, the sixth son of Lam Chi-fung, as the chairman of the organizing committee. The clinic was opened in 1956 on Waterloo Road, Kowloon. In 1959, under the promotion of Lam Chi-fung, the Hong Kong government further agreed to build a Hong Kong Baptist Hospital next to the planned Waterloo Road Baptist College building. Construction of the Baptist Hospital began in April 1959, was completed in 1962, and officially opened on July 1, 1963.

== International activities ==
As a leading figure of the Hong Kong Baptist Church, Lam Chi-fung was an important bridge between Hong Kong and the United States and other overseas Baptist churches. After the war, he actively participated in the work of the Baptist World Alliance. In 1955, he attended the Ninth World Baptist Congress in London, England, as a representative of Hong Kong for the first time, and was elected as the vice president of the congress. He was later awarded an honorary doctorate of law by Oklahoma Baptist University in the United States. Subsequently, he was re-elected as Vice President of the 10th Baptist World Alliance in 1960, and during his attendance at the convention in Brazil, he was awarded the honorary citizenship of Brazil and the key to the city of Rio de Janeiro. Later, when he visited the United States, he was awarded the honorary citizenship of Texas and the honorary citizenship and key to the city of North Carolina. In 1965, he once again went to the United States to attend the 11th World Baptist Congress, and was subsequently awarded honorary doctorates of law by Baylor University and Stetson University. During his stay in the United States, he also successfully raised US$200,000 to support the construction of Baptist College. In recognition of his work in education and Baptist ministry in Hong Kong, Baylor University established the Dr. Lam Chi-fung Science Scholarship in 1959. As for Hong Kong, the British government also awarded him the Queen Elizabeth II Coronation Medal and the OBE in 1953 and 1957 respectively, in recognition of his work in education and charity.

== Later life ==
In his later years, Lam Chi-fung remained dedicated to Baptist ministry and the development of Hong Kong Baptist College. He successfully secured Hong Kong Baptist College's registration as a post-secondary institution recognized by the Hong Kong government in March 1970. Many years later, in 1994, Baptist College was officially approved by the Hong Kong government to become Hong Kong Baptist University.

At 8:50 a.m. on April 17, 1971, Lam Chi-fung died of a stroke at Hong Kong Baptist Hospital at the age of 78. After his death, his family held a funeral service for him at the Kowloon Funeral Home on April 24, and a memorial service was held at the Kowloon City Baptist Church on the same day. His body was subsequently buried at the Hong Kong Chinese Christian Churches Union Pok Fu Lam Road Cemetery. In addition, many schools and churches that had close ties with Lam Chi-fung during his lifetime, such as Hong Kong Baptist College, Pui Ching Middle School in Hong Kong and Pui Ching Middle School in Macau, held memorial events of all sizes after his death to express their condolences. As for the position of principal of Hong Kong Baptist College left by Lam, it was taken over by Dr. Daniel Tse, head of the Department of Physics at the College.

== Family ==
In 1920, Lam Chi-fung married Chan Sze-Ting in his hometown of Jieyang County. Lam's wife was born in 1902 and came from a prominent family in the region. After their marriage, the couple had seven sons and two daughters. The seven sons were Daniel Lam See-hin, David See-chai Lam, Lin (or Lam) Sijin, Lin Sizhong, Lin Sijing, Lin Si'an and Lin Siyao. The two daughters were named Lin Siying and Lin Siqian. The eldest son, Lam See-hin, served as an appointed member of the Hong Kong Municipal Council and a non-official member of the Legislative Council, Chairman of the Board of Directors of Ka Wah Bank, and Chairman of the Board of Directors of Hong Kong Baptist College, and was awarded the CBE. The second son, Lam See-chai, served as Lieutenant Governor of British Columbia, Canada from 1988 to 1995, becoming the first Chinese Lieutenant Governor and the second non-white Lieutenant Governor in the country's history. After marrying his wife, Chan Sze-Ting, in his early years, Lam Chi-fung built Sze-Fung Garden in his hometown of Jieyang County in 1920 as his residence. The residence was later designated as a provincial-level cultural relic protection unit by the Guangdong Provincial People's Government in November 2012. After moving to Hong Kong, the Lam family lived in Tai On Terrace in the Western District of Hong Kong Island. Later, due to a landslide, they temporarily lived in the office of Kwong Yuen Shing Hing on Bonham West Street. Later, Lam Chi-fung became wealthy through business and moved his family from Bonham Road to Robinson Road in the Mid-Levels. In 1938, they moved again to their mansion on Ka Lam Pier Road in Kowloon City.

== Selected works ==
- 《中東見聞錄》 (Travels in the Middle East). Hong Kong: Sze-Fung Bookstore, 1958.
- 《友誼旅程》(Journey of Friendship). Hong Kong: Sze-Fung Bookstore, 1961.

== Honors ==
=== Special merits ===
The following lists the full names and abbreviations of honors won by Lam Chi-fung:

- Order of the Dragon and the Precious Star (Vietnam, 1936)
- National Government "Loyalty and Righteousness" Plaque (1940)
- Order of St. John（S.B.St.J.）（1953-01-02）
- Queen Elizabeth II Coronation Medal (June 1953)
- Order of the British Empire (O.B.E.) (List of recipients on New Year's Day 1957,)
- Honorary Citizen (Brazil, 1960)
- Rio de Janeiro Key to the City (Brazil, 1960)
- Texas Honorary Citizen (United States, 1960)
- North Carolina Honorary Citizen and Key to the City (United States, 1960)

=== Honorary doctor degree of laws ===
- Oklahoma Baptist University (United States, 1955)
- Baylor University (USA, 1965)
- Stetson University (USA, 1965)

=== Things named after him ===
- Lam Chi-fung Hall: Located at Pui Ching Middle School, Hong Kong.
- Dr. Lam Chi-fung Memorial Hall: Completed in 1991, located at Pui Ching Primary School, Hong Kong.
- Lam Chi-fung Memorial Building: Located at Min Sheng College.
- Dr. Lam Chi-fung Memorial Building: An expansion of the University Hall at Hong Kong Baptist University.
- Dr. Lam Chi-fung Memorial Cup: A sporting event at Hong Kong Baptist University.
- Dr. Lam Chi-fung Science Scholarship: Established at Baylor University, USA.

== See also ==
- Baptist Church
- Baptist Convention of Hong Kong
- Chinese YMCA of Hong Kong
- CITIC Ka Wah Bank
- Pui Ching Middle School (Hong Kong)
- Hong Kong Baptist University
- Daniel Lam (businessman)
- David Lam
- Henry Fok
