= Daniel Lam (businessman) =

Businessman from Hong Kong

Daniel Lam See-hin CBE, JP (Chinese: 林思顯; 12 January 1922 – 8 August 2007) was a Hong Kong businessman. He was the director of the Ka Wah Bank and an unofficial member of the Legislative Council of Hong Kong in 1967 and 1968.

== Biography ==
Lam was born on 12 January 1922. His father, Lam Chi-fung, was the founder of the Ka Wah Bank. He graduated from the Munsang College, Hong Kong and the University of the Philippines with a bachelor's degree in Engineering. He went to the study at the Baylor University where he received the degree of Doctor of Laws.

After he education, he joined the family business and was appointed director of the bank in 1960. He was also the chairman and the general manager of the Chiap Hua Flashlights and the Chik Fung Investments. He co-founded the Federation of Hong Kong Industries, the Hong Kong Management Association and the Hong Kong Trade Development Council. As a public figure, he sat on many government committees including the Trade Advisory Committee, the Transport Advisory Committee, the Hong Kong Export Credit Insurance Corporation, and the Committee on Self-financing Post-secondary Education.

He was made Justice of the Peace in 1964 and appointed member of the Urban Council of Hong Kong in 1965. In 1967 and 1968, he was provisionally appointed to the Legislative Council of Hong Kong as an unofficial member replacing Fung Hon-chu and Tse Yu-chuen who were absent on leave respectively. He was also awarded Member and Commander of the Order of the British Empire.

He was the chairman of the Council of the Hong Kong Baptist College, today's Baptist University, which was founded by his father. He was also the chancellor of the Munsang College, member of the management committee of the Ng Yuk Secondary School, and the member of the Council of the Hong Kong Polytechnic before it became a university. He had been chairman of the Chinese YMCA of Hong Kong. He was the president of the Baptist Convention of Hong Kong and the Hong Kong Chiu Chow Chamber of Commerce.

He emigrated to the United States in 1977. Originally settled in South California, he moved to Pearland, Texas in 2000. He died in Houston, Texas on 8 August 2007, aged 86, and buried at the Mount Olivet Cemetery.

His brother, Daniel Lam See-chai, was a Canadian entrepreneur and the first Chinese Lieutenant Governor of British Columbia.
