= Baptist Lui Ming Choi Secondary School =

Secondary school in Hong Kong

Coordinates: 22°23′6″N 114°11′36.7″E

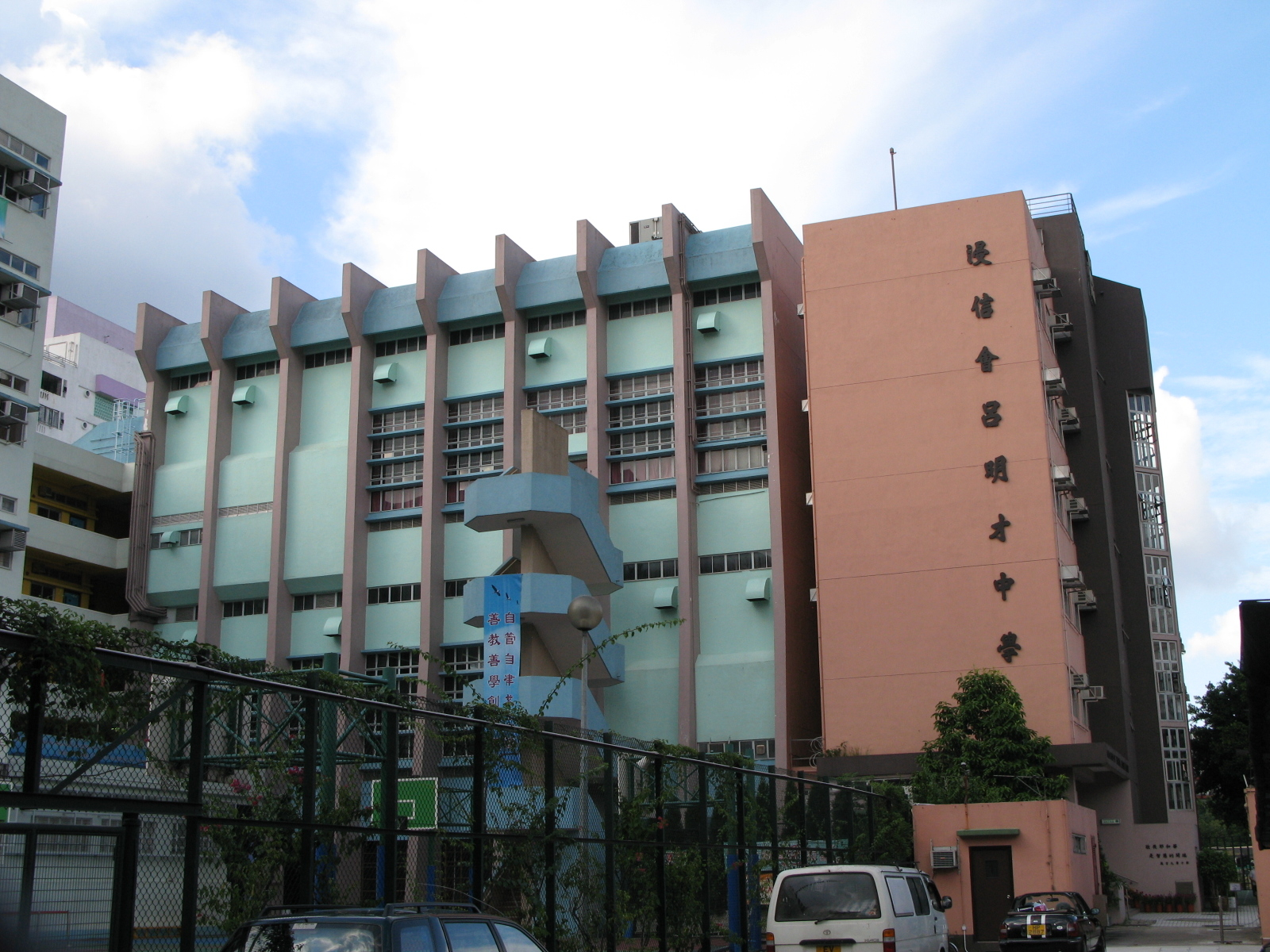
- Baptist Lui Ming Choi Secondary School in August 2007
- 11 Yuen Wo Road, Sha Tin District, Hong Kong

Information
- School type: Aided, Grammar, day, Secondary school
- Motto: The fear of the Lord is the beginning of wisdom, and the knowledge of the Holy One is understanding. (Proverbs 9:10)
- Religious affiliation: Baptist Convention of Hong Kong
- Denomination: Baptist Christian
- Established: 1978; 48 years ago
- Founder: Lui Ming Choi Foundation
- Principal: Mr. Andy Ka-kit Wan
- Grades: Form 1 to Form 6
- Gender: co-education
- Enrollment: ~1000
- Classes: 30
- Language: Instruction: English; Administration: Chinese
- Classrooms: 42
- Area: 4,945 square meter
- Houses: Red House, Yellow House, Blue House, Green House
- Publication: Qīng Miáo
- Newspaper: Míng Dào
- Yearbook: Beyond LMC
- Feeder schools: Baptist (Sha Tin Wai) Lui Ming Choi Primary School and Baptist Lui Ming Choi Primary School
- Motto: Understanding God's teachings to become wise and intellectual (明道致知)
- Philosophy: Christian-style whole-person education
- Student union: democratic, with election on a one-student-one-vote basis
- Website: http://www.blmcss.edu.hk/

Baptist Lui Ming Choi Secondary School
- Traditional Chinese: 浸信會呂明才中學
- Simplified Chinese: 浸信会吕明才中学
Transcriptions
Standard Mandarin
- Hanyu Pinyin: Jìnxìnhuì Lǚ Míngcái Zhōngxué
Yue: Cantonese
- Jyutping: zam3 seon3 wui6*2 leoi5 ming4 zi2 zung1 hok6

Baptist Lui Ming Choi Secondary School (BLMCSS) (Chinese: 浸信會呂明才中學) is a government-aided, co-educational grammar school, run by the Baptist Convention of Hong Kong since 1978. Situated in 11 Yuen Wo Road, the new town of Sha Tin, the school offers secondary education from Secondary 1 (S1) to Secondary 6 (S6), comprising three years of junior secondary (S1–S3) and three years of senior secondary (S4–S6). The school follows the Hong Kong curriculum with English as the medium of instruction whereas Cantonese are used for subjects like Chinese Language, Chinese History, Chinese Literature, Liberal Studies, Visual Arts, Physical Education. In junior forms, Mandarin Chinese is also taught.

The school is renowned for its academic excellence and its all-round achievements in various fields including sports, music, performing arts, technological innovation and social services. BLMCSS is a Band 1school in Sha tin area, and there are two nominated primary schools, Baptist (Sha Tin Wai) Lui Ming Choi Primary School and Baptist Lui Ming Choi Primary School.

== School ethos ==
Under the Baptist Convention of Hong Kong, the school was founded by the Lui Ming Choi Foundation. It is one of the five secondary schools operating under the supervision of the convention. The school's motto is 'Understanding God's teachings to become wise and intellectual ', "明道致知" in Chinese, derived from the idea of Zhu Xi, a Confucianist in the Song dynasty and incorporated this into Christian belief, which means understanding God’s teachings to become wise and intellectual. This concludes the expectation for its graduates.

Though the school holds the spread of the Gospel to be one of its missions, its culture and atmosphere remains relatively open and liberal in the socio-political aspect. The school and its Student Union had previously held memorial service and activities concerning the Tiananmen Square protests and June Fourth Movement which happened in mainland China, 1989.

== Campus ==
Situated at the bank of Shing Mun River, the campus development is restrained. Nonetheless, the school extended the new wing in 1999 and undertook renovation and classroom reshuffle in order to facilitate the setting up of its multimedia laboratory and language laboratory. In the construction plan, a roof garden was included. The building of garden expanded the very limited space in where casual activities or even relaxation for students and staff could be taken place. Apart from classrooms and congregation hall, the school equips with science laboratories, playgrounds, rooms for various kinds of art, language and multimedia facilities for modern education.

The school applied to Education Bureau (EDB) in 2007 for a new campus site reserved under the Kowloon-Canton Railway Corporation Tai Wai Maintenance Centre Property Development Project, but lost to Shatin Tsung Tsin Secondary School.

In February 2015, the construction project of a new annex was approved by the Financial Committee of the Legislative Council. The Project commenced on 28 December 2015 and will be finished in 2018. The government burdened around 150 million dollars for the construction project.

The school launched a ten-year campus enhancement project, divided into two phases, aimed at preparing the physical infrastructure for teaching and learning in the 21st century:

- Phase One (2014/15-2018/19): The new wing building was completed in 2019, with an opening ceremony on April 30, 2019, and officially opened in September 2019. Additionally, the old wing was repainted, and the facilities in classrooms and faculty offices were updated to accommodate the new expansion. Completed projects in Phase One included the performance hall, maker space, rooftop garden renovation, library expansion, and faculty lounges.
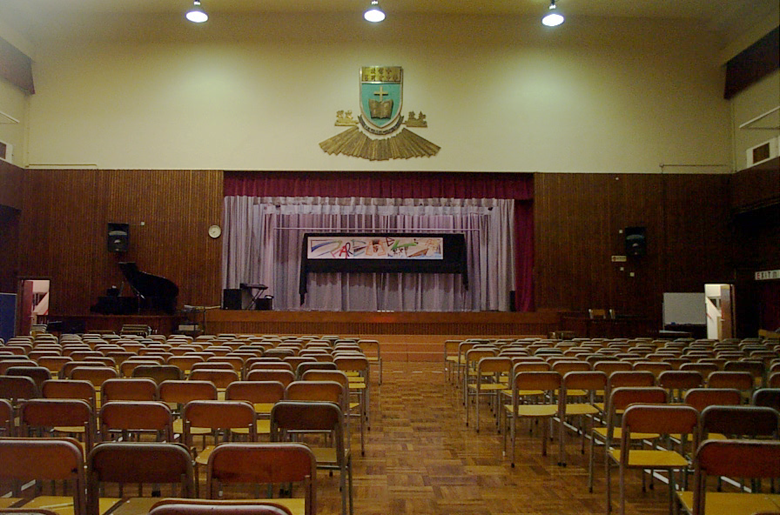
  The ceremony hall, officially named as Mr. and Mrs. Hung Chi-din Hall (洪紫電伉儷大禮堂)
- Phase Two (2019/20-2023/24): This phase involves the optimization and renovation of special rooms and all public spaces. Plans include optimizing public spaces such as the ground floor platform, improving side corridors and bicycle parking areas, adding an archery range, and adding a school history room etc.

== Language Policy ==
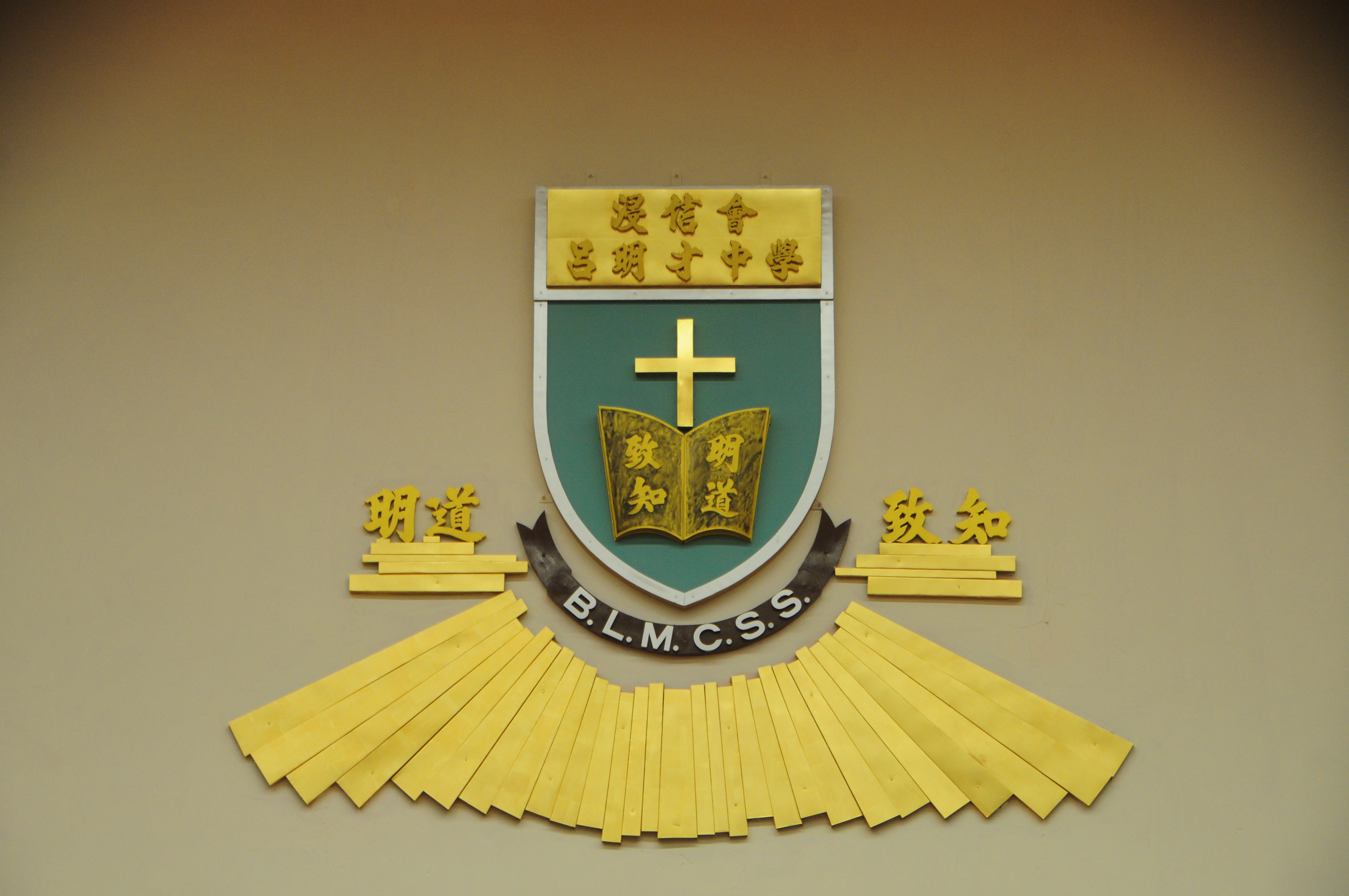
The school bange displayed in the school hall. The school bange is surrounded by the school motto "明道致知" and the golden rays.

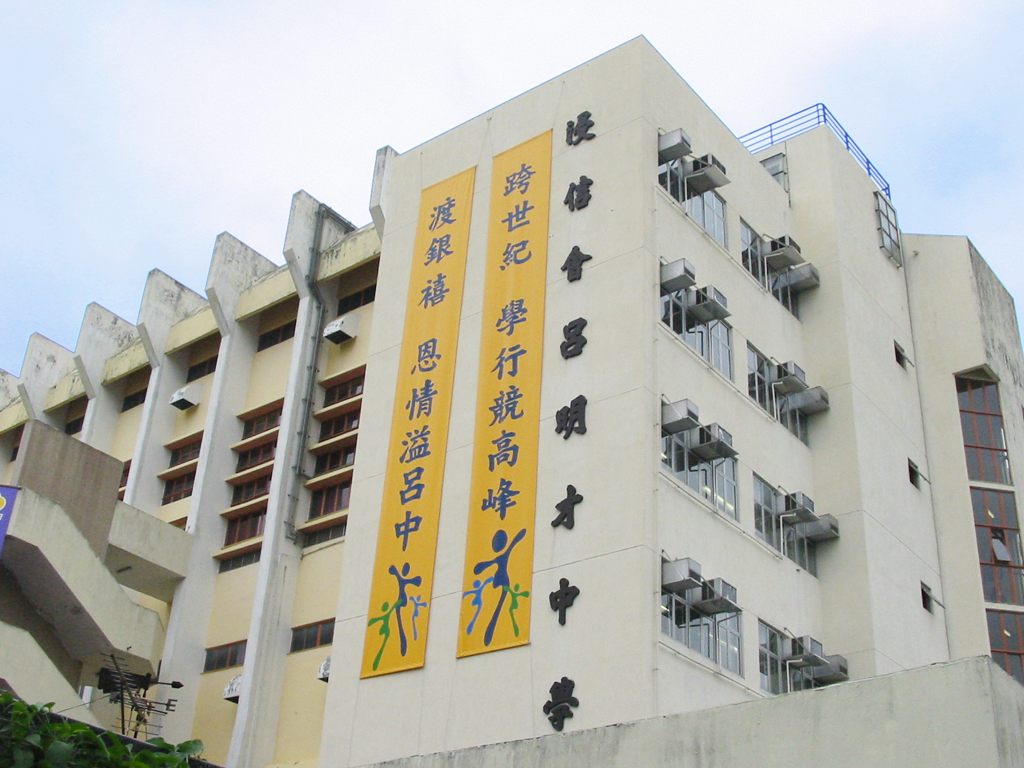
The exterior of the campus in 2000 before the renovation

English is adopted as the medium of instruction in most subjects. An English-rich environment is cultivated with concerted efforts of staff communicating with students in English and daily English activities organised with the help of the Chatteris Native-speaking English Teacher and English Ambassadors. Themed English activities are also held by the English Society regularly. As well, there is a special interest class in Literature and the Debating Team led by the Native-speaking English Teacher. School notices and publications are issued in English.

== Class Structure ==
As per School Profile in 2025, BLMCSS offer 5 classes in S1 to S3 and 6 classes in S4-S6, total 33 classes. Junior classes studies subjects of all streams like languages, computer, arts, science, sports, Chinese history, history and music etc. As a Christian school, studied of bible is included in the curriculum.

To complying with the Hong Kong Diploma of Secondary Education, a total of 145 combinations, each consisting of 3 elective subjects chosen from the electives, are offered. Two optional modules in the Mathematics Extended Part are also provided along with some of the combinations below:

- Core subjects: Chinese Language, English Language, Mathematics, Citizenship and Social Development
- Elective subjects: Biology, Business Accounting & Financial Studies, Chemistry, Chinese History, Chinese Literature, Economics, Geography, History, Information and Communication Technology, Mathematics Extended Part 1 & 2 (M1 & M2), Physics, Visual Arts
- Network Programme: Music, Other Languages (French, Japanese, Korean & Spanish), Applied Learning (lessons in other schools/institutes)

Subject Combinations
Class	A	B	C	D	E	F
Maths Extension	M2 (Algebra & Calculus)	M1 (Calculus & Statistics)	/	/	/	/
Subject 1	Physics	Physics	Biology / Economics / History			Chemistry
Subject 2	Chemistry	Business, Accoiunting and Financial Studies (Management)/ Chemistry / Chinese Literature / Geography / Information Communication Technology / Biology				
Subject 3	Biology / Business, Accounting and Financial Studies (Accounting)/ Chinese History / Information Communication Technology/ Economics / Visual Arts					

== Study Population ==
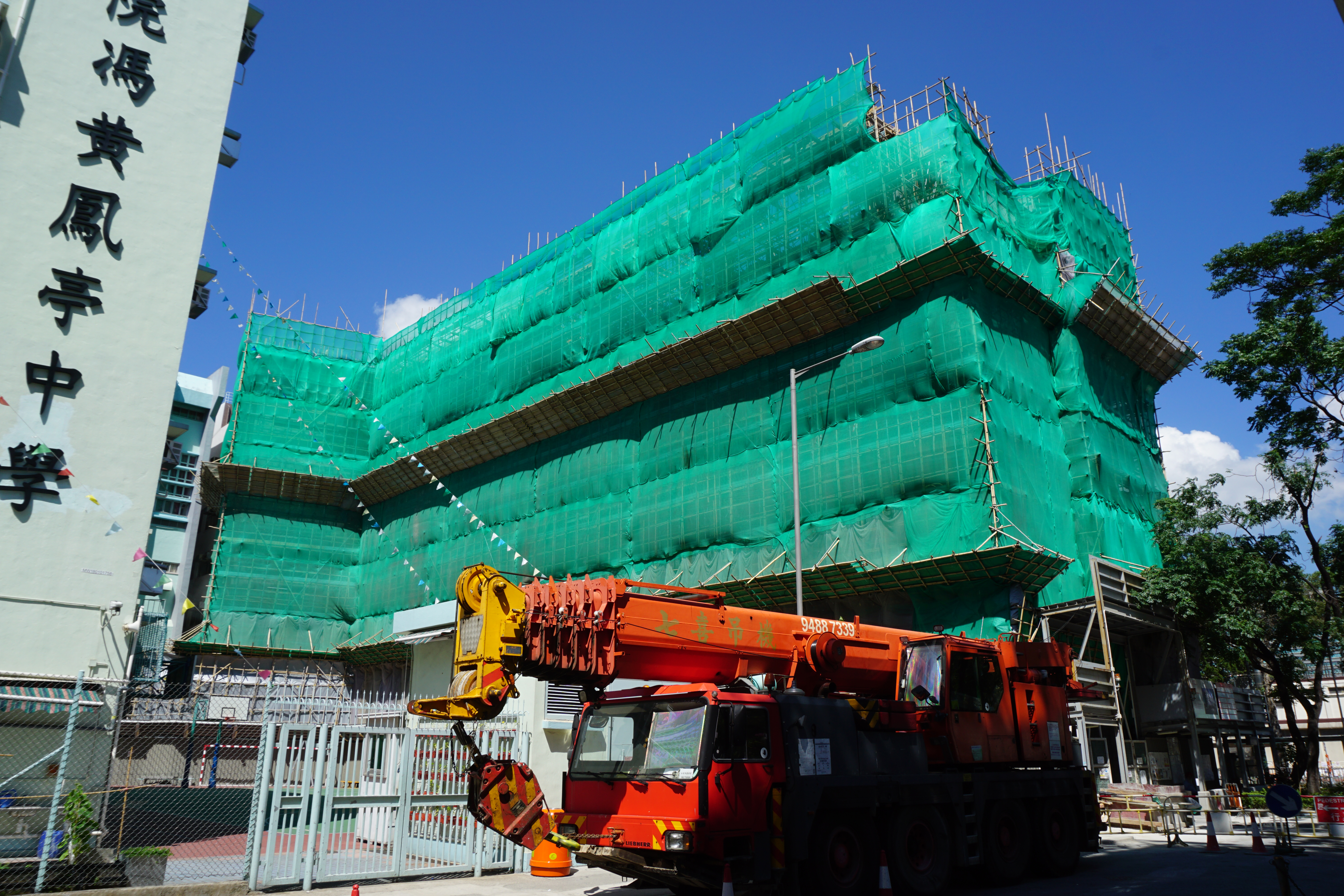
Lui Kwok Pat Fung Teaching Block of Baptist Lui Ming Choi Secondary School under construction

As of September 2025 there are 908 students in the school. The majority of our students are ethnic Chinese and their mother tongue is Cantonese.

== Qualification of Teachers ==
All teachers possess bachelor's degrees. 53.4% of them have master's degrees. 98.6% of them have received formal teaching training.

== Extracurricular activities ==
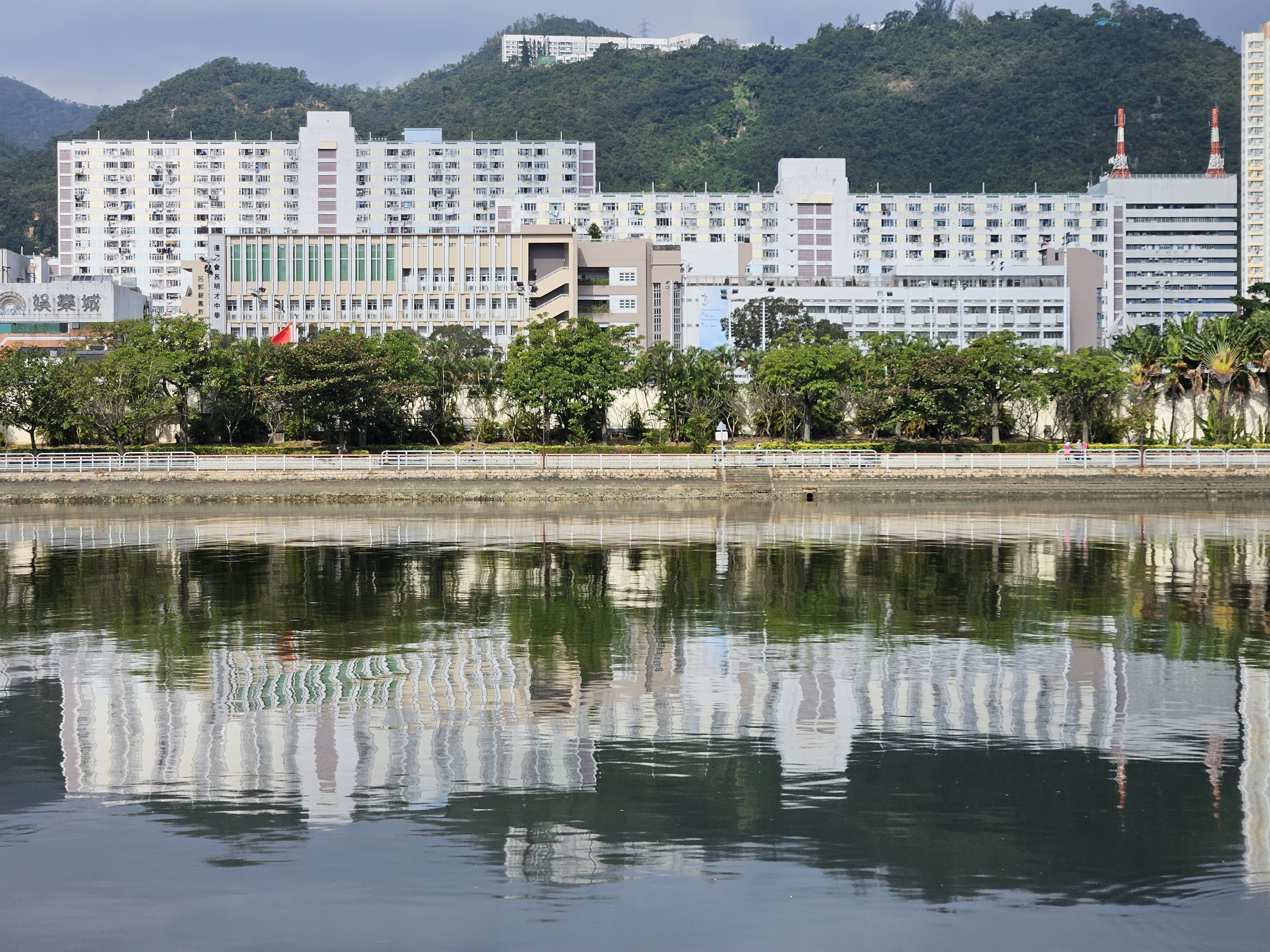
Baptist Lui Ming Choi Secondary School in December 2023, the left part is the Lui Kwok Pat Fung Teaching Block.

The school traditionally accommodates an active student body. Students participate widely in programmes and competitions of sports, music, performing arts, technological innovation and so on. There are more than 80 extracurricular activities students, most numerous options among schools in Hong Kong. Numerous students secured prestigious awards like Sir Edward Youde Memorial Scholarship in Hong Kong.

Baptist Lui Ming Choi Secondary School boasts as one of the HK secondary schools with the largest variety of extracurricular activities for students to participate in, with particular strengths in sports, drama, and music. Many prizes have been awarded to the students of BLMCSS. Below is a list of student clubs:

- Student Union
- Academic Societies: Art Society, Design and Technology Society (Robotics Team), Home Economics Society, Europe Club, Bridge Club, Mathematics Society, Magic Club, Geography Society, Music Society, English Society, Chinese Society, Biology Society etc.
- Service: Boy Scouts, Girl Guides, Red Cross, Peer Support Scheme, Stage Support team, CampusTV, Prefect etc.
- Sports: PE Society and other ball teams(Football, Basketball, Handball, Volleyball, Badminton, Table Tennis), Folk Dance Club, Jazz Dance Club, Oriental Dance Club, Latin Dance Club
- Music: Music Society, and more than 30 different instrument class, including both Western and Chinese instruments
- Drama: Drama Club (Drama is a compulsory academic subject for F.1 students)

== Student Union ==
The Baptist Lui Ming Choi Secondary School Student Union (also known as BLMCSSSU or LMCSU) has the longest history in its sort among schools in the East New Territories. Formed in 1983, the students' union has been playing a key role in students' activities, as well as external involvement. Departments of the Union organise ranges of programme and activity to enhance learning experience and campus life. It also connects the student population with other schools' fellows through joint schools functions and friendly dialogues.

The Union is a democratic organisation which consists of two main bodies: the executive committee, which is the cabinet executing mandated power, and the Representative Council, holding power of amending the Constitution of the Union, passing working plans, budgets, approving reports, debate and vote on Committee proposals. In principle, the Committee and the Council cooperate to enact and push forward any proposals and plans. The principal acts as the President-in-Nomine. 2 to 3 teaching staff are assigned by the Principal to be Advisors to supervise and guide the operation of the Union, who are seen to be real supervisors. The Committee coordinates working schedule and details with Advisors' consent, though not bounded in the Constitution.

Counselors are elected once a year. There is one seat for every class, therefore 31 in total. The method adopted is simple majority and monitored by the class teacher at the academic year commencement in September. Nomination is open to all in the class except members in any proposed cabinet(s) in the Committee election. Generally, most senior will seek incumbency and have sort of association with proposed cabinet(s) to complete the political system of the Union.

== Form Associations ==
The school hope to increase students’ sense of belonging, not only to the class but also to the form and the school. We encourage students to participate in Form Association activities to expand their social networks and open up new vistas.

Year	F1 -F5	Name of Form Association	
1	1978-1983	明道	MING DAO
2	1979-1984	仁	REN
3	1980-1985	煒	WEI
4	1981-1986	暉	HUI
5	1982-1987	傑	JIE
6	1983-1988	熹	XI
7	1984-1989	智	ZHI
8	1985-1990	信	XIN
9	1986-1991	煜	YU
10	1987-1992	昆	KUN
11	1988-1993	俊	JUN
12	1989-1994	煦	XU
13	1990-1995	昕	XIN
14	1991-1996	倬	ZHUO
15	1992-1997	燁	YE
16	1993-1998	溢	YI
17	1994-1999	英	YING
18	1995-2000	愷	KAI
19	1996-2001	泓	HONG
20	1997-2002	藝	YI
21	1998-2003	恒	HENG
22	1999-2004	清	QING
23	2000-2005	芊	QIAN
24	2001-2006	志	ZHI
25	2002-2007	深	SHEN
26	2003-2008	萃	CUI
27	2004-2009	懿	YI
28	2005-2010	永	YONG
29	2006-2012	菁	JING
30	2007-2013	情	QING
31	2008-2014	銘	MING
32	2009-2015	純	CHUN
33	2010-2016	樂	LE
34	2011-2017	鍛	DUAN
35	2012-2018	繫	XI
36	2013-2019	榮	RONG
37	2014-2020	銳	RUI
38	2015-2021	綽	CHUO
39	2016-2022	柱	ZHU
40	2017-2023	鎧	KAI
41	2018-2024	縴	QIAN
42	2019-2025	柏	BAI
43	2020-2026	鋒	FENG
44	2021-2027	緣	YUAN
45	2022-2028	格	GE
46	2023-2029	義	YI

== The 4 Houses ==
Students are grouped into four Houses, namely Red, Yellow, Blue, and Green. These four Houses will be involved in various competitions and activities throughout the school year including Swimming Gala, Sports Day, handball, badminton, table tennis, basketball, and Chinese chess competitions. The school hope, through these activities, that students can get along with junior and senior schoolmates in addition to their peers at the same grade or in the same class, expanding their social circle, and cultivating a sense of belonging to the School.

== Politics ==
The school has hosted former Chief Secretary for Administration Anson Chan, President of the Legislative Council of Hong Kong Jasper Tsang, and entrepreneur Joseph Lee for lectures. In 2015, the school hosted Joshua Wong to speak about politics and civil disobedience which caused a group of parents to protest outside the school that Wong was teaching their students to violate the law.

== Alumni ==
Due to the influence of the serving culture in their alma mater, alumni are observed in facets of social commitment. Large portion of graduates pitched themselves into education, some of them in academic research. Similarly large portion achieved qualification in professions like legal, medical services, and engineering business.

== Notable alumni ==
- Moon Lau, an actress under TVB management

== See also ==
- Education in Hong Kong
