= National government =

A national government is the government of a nation.

National government or National Government may also refer to:

- Central government in a unitary state, or a country that does not give significant power to regional divisions
- Federal government, the government of a federal state, or a country that gives significant power to regional divisions
- National unity government, an all-party coalition government, usually formed during a time of war or other national emergency

== Specific governments ==
- Governments of the Republic of China
  - National Government of the Republic of China, from 1925 to 1948
  - Reorganized National Government of the Republic of China, from 1940 to 1945
- National Government (Canada), the name of the historic Conservative Party of Canada c. 1940
- National Government (United Kingdom), the British government from 1931 to 1940
- New Zealand National Party governments
  - First National Government of New Zealand, the New Zealand government led by Sidney Holland from 1949 to 1957
  - Second National Government of New Zealand, the New Zealand government led by Keith Holyoake from 1960 to 1972
  - Third National Government of New Zealand, the New Zealand government led by Robert Muldoon from 1975 to 1984
  - Fourth National Government of New Zealand, the New Zealand government led by Jim Bolger and Jenny Shipley respectively from 1990 to 1999
  - Fifth National Government of New Zealand, the New Zealand government led by John Key and Bill English respectively from 2008 to 2017
- Polish National Government (disambiguation)
- Provisional National Government of the Southwestern Caucasus, a provisional government based in Kars, Turkey
- Transitional National Government, the Somali government from 2000 to 2004
- Tsilhqot'in National Government, an indigenous government in British Columbia, Canada
- Ukrainian national government (1941)

== See also ==
- National Government Parks, Japan
