= Hong Kong Baptist Theological Seminary =

Seminary in Hong Kong

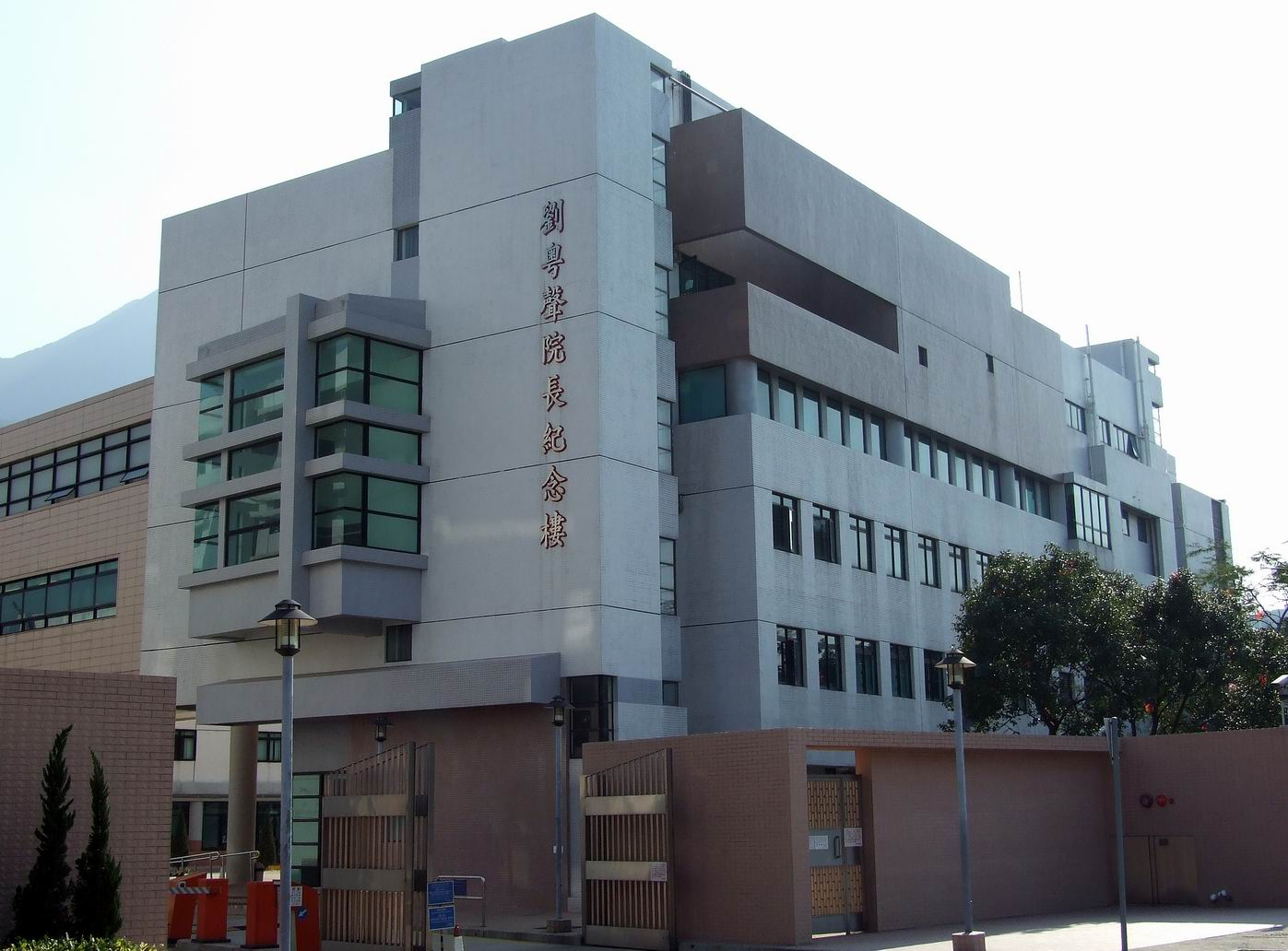
- Hong Kong Baptist Theological Seminary in February 2008
- Motto: Correctly handles the word of truth
- Type: Private
- Established: 1951; 75 years ago
- Affiliation: Baptist Convention of Hong Kong
- Address: 1 Nin Ming Road, Sai O, Sai Kung North, Hong Kong, China
- Campus: Urban
- Website: www.hkbts.edu.hk

The Hong Kong Baptist Theological Seminary is a Baptist theological institute located in Hong Kong, China. It is affiliated with the Baptist Convention of Hong Kong.

== History ==
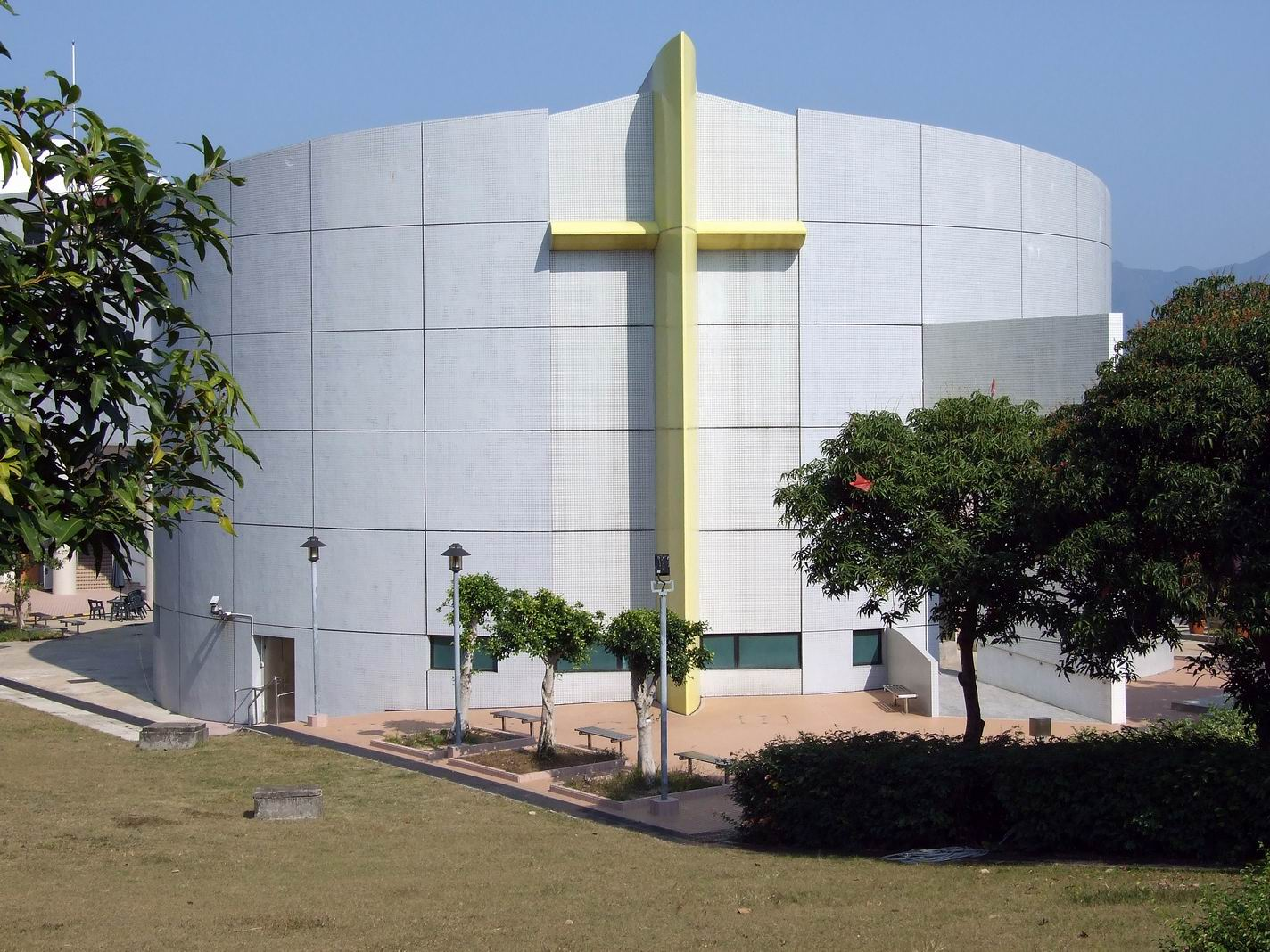
Campus church in February 2008

The school was founded in 1951 by the Baptist Convention of Hong Kong on the premises of Kowloon City Baptist Church. In 1958, it inaugurated a new campus. In 1999, it moved to its current building.

== Programs ==
The school offers programs in evangelical theology, whose licentiate, master and doctorate.
