= Central government =

Type of government found in unitary states

A central government is the government that is a controlling power over a unitary state. Another distinct but sovereign political entity is a federal government, which may have distinct powers at various levels of government, authorized or delegated to it by the federation and mutually agreed upon by each of the federated states.

The structure of central governments varies. Many countries have created autonomous regions by delegating powers from the central government to governments on a sub-national level, such as regional, state, provincial, local and other instances. Based on a broad definition of a basic political system, there are two or more levels of government that exist within an established territory and government through common institutions with overlapping or shared powers as prescribed by a constitution or other law.

Common responsibilities of this level of government which are not granted to lower levels are maintaining national security and exercising international diplomacy, including the right to sign binding treaties. Essentially, the central government has the power to make laws for the whole country, in contrast with local governments.

The difference between a central government and a federal government is that the autonomous status of self-governing regions exists by the sufferance of the central government and are often created through a process of devolution. As such they may be unilaterally revoked with a simple change in the law. An example of this was done in 1973 when the Northern Ireland Constitution Act 1973 abolished the government of Northern Ireland which had been created under the Government of Ireland Act 1920. (Note: Although this is not true in some cases. The permanency of the Scottish Government is affirmed by the Scotland Act 2016, unless a referendum is held.) It is common for a federal government to be brought into being by agreement between a number of formally independent states and therefore its powers to affect the status of the balance of powers is significantly smaller (as in the United States). Thus federal governments are often established voluntarily from 'below' whereas devolution grants self-government from above.

== Examples ==
=== Unitary states ===
There are, and have been, many countries which have delegated powers, some include:

- Bangladesh
- China, People's Republic of (Mainland China) – see the autonomous administrative divisions of China
- Denmark – see the autonomous territories of the Faroe Islands and Greenland
- Egypt
- Finland – devolved powers to the government of Åland
- France – see the sui generis collectivity of New Caledonia
- (Georgia (country)) Georgia – see the autonomous republics of Georgia
- Greece
- Iceland
- Indonesia
- (Republic of Ireland) Ireland
- Israel
- Italy – see the autonomous provinces of Italy
- Japan
- Netherlands
- New Zealand
- Norway
- Philippines – see the provinces of the Philippines and Bangsamoro Autonomous Region of Muslim Mindanao
- Portugal – see the Autonomous Regions of Portugal
- Saudi Arabia
- Korea, Republic of (South Korea)
- Spain – see the autonomous communities of Spain
- Sweden
- Thailand
- Turkey
- Ukraine
- United Kingdom – devolved powers to the governments of Northern Ireland, Scotland, and Wales
- Vietnam

=== Federations ===
A federal government is the common or national government of a federation. The United States is considered the first modern federation. After declaring independence from Britain, the United States adopted its first constitution, the Articles of Confederation in 1781. This was the first step towards federalism by establishing the confederal Congress. However, Congress was limited as to its ability to pursue economic, military, and judiciary reform. In 1787, a Constitutional Convention drafted the Constitution of the United States during the Philadelphia Convention. After the ratification of the Constitution by nine states in 1788, the United States was officially a federation, putting the United States in a unique position where the central government exists by the sufferance of the individual states rather than the reverse.

Other states followed suit in establishing federal governments: Switzerland (1848); Canada (1867); Germany (1871 and again 1949); Brazil (1891); Australia (1901); Russia (1917); Austria (1920 and again 1945) and India (1947 and again 1950). Examples include:

- Argentina
- Australia – see the states and territories of Australia
- Austria
- Belgium – see the communities, regions and language areas of Belgium
- Bosnia and Herzegovina
- Brazil – see the federative units of Brazil
- Canada – see the provinces and territories of Canada
- Ethiopia
- Germany – see states of Germany
- India - see the states and union territories of India
- Iraq
- Malaysia
- Mexico – see the states of Mexico
- (Federated States of Micronesia) Micronesia
- Nepal
- Nigeria
- Pakistan – see the administrative units of Pakistan
- Russia – see the federal districts of Russia and the federal subjects of Russia
- Sudan
- Switzerland – see the cantons of Switzerland
- United Arab Emirates – see the emirates of the United Arab Emirates
- United States – see the U.S. states
- Venezuela – see the states of Venezuela

=== Confederations ===
- Confederate States of America
- United States of America under the Articles of Confederation

== See also ==
- Autonomous government
- Devolution of powers
- Federation
- List of autonomous areas by country
- National Government (disambiguation)
