= National unity government =

Broad coalition government involving all or most parties

A national unity government, also called a government of national unity (GNU) or national union government, is a broad coalition government that includes all or most major political parties in a legislature. These governments usually form during a war, a state of emergency, or to preserve a country's political stability. Operating on the principles of consensus democracy, a unity government typically lacks a formal opposition, or its opposition parties are too small to be meaningful.

== By country ==
=== Afghanistan ===
Following the disputed 2014 presidential elections, a National Unity Government (NUG) between both run-off candidates was formed with Ashraf Ghani as President of Afghanistan and Abdullah Abdullah in the new office of Chief Executive of Afghanistan. This power-sharing agreement broke apart after the 2019 Afghan presidential election, after which Ghani abolished the office of Chief Executive while Abdullah again refused to recognize Ghani's presidency and demanded the formation of a new government in northern Afghanistan. Both politicians lost power after the Taliban overthrew the Afghan government in 2021.

=== Canada ===
During World War I, the Conservative government of Sir Robert Borden invited the Liberal opposition to join the government as a means of dealing with the Conscription crisis of 1917. The Liberals, led by Sir Wilfrid Laurier refused; however, Borden was able to convince many individual Liberals to join what was called a Union Government, which defeated the Laurier Liberals in the fall 1917 election.

During World War II, the opposition Conservative Party ran under the name National Government in the 1940 election as a means of promoting their platform of creating a wartime national government coalition (evocative of the previous war's Union government). The party was not successful in the election, which re-elected the Liberal government of William Lyon Mackenzie King, whose party continued to rule alone for the duration of World War II.

==== Newfoundland ====
The Dominion of Newfoundland (not to be part of Canada for another three decades) had a National Government during World War I led by Edward Patrick Morris.

=== China ===
In modern Chinese history, the Republic of China twice saw United Fronts forms to provide national unity in a time of civil conflict. The First United Front (1923–1927) saw the Nationalists (KMT) and Communists (CCP) unite to end warlordism within the country, however since neither party was the centrally recognised Government of China at the time the First United Front cannot be viewed as a true example of a national unity government.

Following the advent of the Second Sino-Japanese War, the KMT, the now solely recognised central party of the country, once again opted to form the Second United Front with the CCP – the two parties at this point had been engaged in an open civil war since the collapse of the First United Front. This new front acted as a national unity government for the extent of the war and represented the solely recognised government for China at the time, though the overall level of cooperation between the two parties – past the cessation of hostility – was mostly nominal.

=== Croatia ===
Croatia formed a national unity government in 1991 under prime minister Franjo Gregurić in response to the outbreak of the Croatian War of Independence. Even though the cabinet included ministers from minority parties, all heads of ministries were either from the majority Croatian Democratic Union or soon defected to it.

=== Estonia ===
Estonia had national unity governments during the Estonian War of Independence (Päts I–III Provisional cabinets) and after the 1924 coup d'état attempt by the Communist Party of Estonia (Jaakson cabinet).

=== Greece ===
A national unity government in Greece is often called ecumenical government:

- 1926 under Alexandros Zaimis
- 1944 under Georgios Papandreou ( Greek Government of National Unity (1944))
- 1974 under Konstantinos Karamanlis
- 1989 under Xenophon Zolotas
- 2011 under Lucas Papademos

=== Hungary ===
There are five periods in Hungary when national unity governments emerged:

- 1917–1918, during World War I (Móric Esterházy and Sándor Wekerle cabinets)
- 1919–1920, cabinet of Károly Huszár, restoration of the Kingdom of Hungary
- 1944–1945, during World War II, Government of National Unity (Ferenc Szálasi cabinet)
- 1944–1947, opposition government during World War II (Béla Miklós) and after following Zoltán Tildy and Ferenc Nagy cabinets)
- 1956, during the Hungarian Revolution of 1956 (third cabinet of Imre Nagy)

=== Ireland ===
A national unity government, following the failure of government formation after the 2020 general election, was suggested to deal with the COVID-19 pandemic. Instead, a Fianna Fáil–Fine Gael–Green coalition was formed, creating the 32nd government of Ireland.

=== Israel ===
Israel has had several national unity governments, in which major rival parties formed a ruling coalition. Such coalitions were formed in the days leading up to the Six-Day War in 1967, in the late 1980s and amidst the COVID-19 pandemic in 2020. The 36th government, formed in 2021, was a national unity government that has been frequently described as the most diverse governments in Israeli history, consisting of right-wing, centrist, left-wing and one Arab Islamist political party. Following the October 7 attack by Hamas, the National Unity party became part of an Israeli war cabinet, joining the 37th government. The National Unity party left the war cabinet in June 2024, leading to the cabinet's dissolution.

=== Italy ===
In the republican era, the first two cabinets, led by Alcide De Gasperi, were supported by all three of the following parties, the pro-American Christian Democrats and the pro-Soviet Italian Communist Party and Italian Socialist Party.

Afterwards, the first government generally recognised as a national unity government was the third Andreotti Cabinet, also known as non-no confidence vote government, as the Italian Communist Party decided to not take part at the confidence vote. The communists voted in favour of the motion of confidence for the following cabinet, still led by Giulio Andreotti.

During the Eurozone crisis, the two main parties, The People of Freedom and the Democratic Party, along with other minor political forces, supported the Monti cabinet, and eventually, after the 2013 general election, formed a grand coalition in support of the Letta Cabinet, which, however, was opposed by a new major political force in parliament, the anti-establishment Five Star Movement.

The Draghi Cabinet, formed during the COVID-19 pandemic and resulting economic crisis, has been described as a national unity government. It comprises a mixture of independent experts as well as politicians from most of Italy's political parties: the Five Star Movement, Democratic Party, League, Forza Italia, Italia Viva, and Free and Equal.

The following is a list of national unity or grand coalition governments:

- De Gasperi II Cabinet (14 July 1946 – 2 February 1947)
- De Gasperi III Cabinet (2 February 1947 – 1 June 1947)
- Andreotti III Cabinet (29 July 1976 – 11 March 1978)
- Andreotti IV Cabinet (11 March 1978 – 20 March 1979)
- Ciampi Cabinet (28 April 1993 – 10 May 1994) – Note: grand coalition support lasted only until 4 May 1993
- Monti Cabinet (16 November 2011 – 28 April 2013)
- Letta Cabinet (28 April 2013 – 22 February 2014) – Note: grand coalition support lasted only until 15 November 2013
- Draghi Cabinet (13 February 2021 – 22 October 2022)

=== Kenya ===
From 2008 to 2013, Kenya was governed by Government of National Unity between the rival Party of National Unity of Mwai Kibaki and the Orange Democratic Movement of Raila Odinga following the 2007 presidential election and subsequent violence. This was due to the ODM winning the majority of seats in the National Assembly, but controversially losing the presidential election by a margin that has since been called into question for its validity.

=== Lebanon ===
Since Lebanon is a multireligious state and consensus democracy, having a national unity government is more favorable in this country. Unlike other democracies, no group in Lebanon can govern alone.

=== Libya ===
Abdul Hamid Dbeibeh, selected as Prime Minister of Libya by the Libyan Political Dialogue Forum (LPDF) on 5 February 2021, is required under the agreements made by the LPDF to nominate a cabinet of ministers to the House of Representatives (HoR) by 26 February 2021, establishing the Government of National Unity (Libya).

=== Luxembourg ===
Luxembourg has had two National Union Governments. The first was formed in 1916, during World War I (in which Luxembourg was neutral, but occupied by Germany nonetheless). It was led by Victor Thorn and included all of the major factions in the Chamber of Deputies, but lasted for only sixteen months.

The second National Union Government was formed in November 1945, in the aftermath of World War II, which had devastated Luxembourg. It was led by Pierre Dupong, who had been prime minister in the government in exile in the war, and included all four parties represented in the Chamber of Deputies. The government lasted until 1947, by which time, a normal coalition between two of the three largest parties had been arranged, thus maintaining the confidence of the legislature.

In addition, Luxembourg had a Liberation Government between November 1944 and November 1945, also under Dupong. It served a similar emergency role to a national government, but included only the two largest parties, the CSV and the LSAP.

=== Malaysia ===
For the first time in Malaysian history, a hung parliament occurred when no political party managed to command a simple majority in the Dewan Rakyat from the 15th general election (GE15). The Yang di-Pertuan Agong called for the formation of a unity government, resulting in both long-time rivals Pakatan Harapan and Barisan Nasional agreeing to join forces, with Anwar Ibrahim appointed as the Prime Minister while Perikatan Nasional decided to be the opposition coalition.

=== Myanmar ===
After the 2021 Myanmar coup, on 16 April 2021, the exiled Committee Representing Pyidaungsu Hluttaw (CRPH) announced the formation of a National Unity Government (Burmese: အမျိုးသား ညီညွတ်ရေး အစိုးရ), pursuant to the Federal Democracy Charter released on 31 March 2021. The National Unity Government re-introduced the position of Prime Minister, and consists of CRPH members and other ethnic leaders.

=== Nepal ===
Following the devastating April 2015 Nepal earthquake, top political parties in Nepal have decided to form a national unity government in order to handle the crisis and draft a constitution that's been long overdue. The major political parties and unified political fronts have agreed to settle the disputed issues of the constitution drafting process by 3 June and to form a national unity government.

=== Palestine ===
The Palestinian Unity Government of June 2014 was a national unity government of the Palestinian National Authority under Palestinian President Mahmoud Abbas formed on 2 June 2014 following the Fatah-Hamas Reconciliation Agreement that had been signed on 23 April 2014. The ministers were nominally independent, but overwhelmingly seen as loyal to President Abbas and his Fatah movement or to smaller leftist factions, none of whom were believed to have close ties to Hamas. However, the Unity Government was not approved by the Palestinian Legislative Council, leading to its legitimacy being questioned. The Unity Government dissolved on 17 June 2015 after President Abbas said it was unable to operate in the Gaza Strip.

=== Poland ===
In the 1989 Polish parliamentary election, Poland's first semi-free election since World War II, candidates backed by the Solidarity movement won all 161 seats up for free election. The ruling Communist-dominated Patriotic Movement for National Rebirth—comprising the Communist Polish United Workers' Party (PZPR), the United People's Party (ZSL), and the Democratic Party (SD)—broke down soon after, as the ZSL and SD formed an alliance with Solidarity. This forced President Wojciech Jaruzelski to appoint the Cabinet of Tadeusz Mazowiecki on 12 September 1989, Poland's first government since World War II with a non-Communist majority. It was a national unity government of Solidarity-endorsed ministers alongside the PZPR, ZSL, and SD, with the Communists still controlling the Defense and Interior ministries. The PZPR was dissolved on 29 January 1990 and its former ministers resigned on 6 July.

=== Portugal ===
A national unity government (known as the Sacred Union Government; Port.: Governo da União Sagrada) was in place during the first year of Portuguese participation in World War I, led by the Evolutionist Party president António José de Almeida from 15 March 1916 to 25 April 1917, and with the participation of the Democratic Party of Afonso Costa.

=== Rwanda ===
After Rwandan genocide in 1994, the Rwandan Patriotic Front (RPF), has ruled Rwanda using tactics which have been characterized as authoritarian. Elections are manipulated in various ways including banning opposition parties, arresting or assassinating critics, and electoral fraud.

=== South Africa ===
The interim constitution negotiated by the multi-party negotiations to end apartheid that started in 1990 allowed all parties that gained more than 5% of the vote to participate in a Government of National Unity. The new government that was elected in the 1994 general election therefore had members from many political parties in the cabinet. This government of national unity lasted until the 1999 general election, although it was dominated by the African National Congress (ANC) and a reported lack of shared decision-making prompted the second-largest party, the National Party, to withdraw from the GNU in 1996.

In the 2024 South African general election, support for the ruling ANC party significantly declined. The ANC remained the largest party but lost the parliamentary majority that it had held since the inaugural post-apartheid election in 1994, which required negotiations between parties on the formation of a government. On 14 June 2024, the ANC, the Democratic Alliance (DA), the Inkatha Freedom Party (IFP) and the Patriotic Alliance (PA), agreed to form a coalition which they referred to as a 'Government of National Unity' (GNU), led by the ANC's Cyril Ramaphosa who was re-elected President of South Africa with the support of the parties who then formed part of the GNU. A further six parties subsequently joined the GNU to form a grand coalition of ten parties, with jointly 287 seats in the 400 seat parliament (72%). The additional parties which joined towards the end of June 2024 were the GOOD Party; Rise Mzansi; Al Jama-ah; the Pan Africanist Congress of Azania (PAC), the United Democratic Movement (UDM) and the Freedom Front Plus. These members of the GNU signed a statement of intent with the African National Congress.

=== Sri Lanka ===
Following the fall of the Mahinda Rajapaksa regime, the United National Party who won the 2015 elections formed a National Unity Government with the main opposition Sri Lanka Freedom Party Under Maithripala Sirisena and Ranil Wickramasinghe.

=== Sweden ===
Sweden has only had one national unity government: The Hansson III cabinet during World War II. The government was made up of all parties in the parliament except the Communist Party which was considered to be pro-Soviet and hence unreliable. The government consisted of six ministers from the Social Democrats (including Prime Minister Per Albin Hansson), three from the Right Party, three from the People's Party, three from the Farmer's League and two nonpartisan politicians. The ultimate goal of this government's policy was to keep Sweden out of the war, which they also succeeded with. The Hansson III government introduced censorship of press, literature and culture, which was applied to both pro-Nazi and pro-communist propaganda. The government also approved departures from the neutrality policy to keep Sweden out of the war.

=== United Kingdom ===
First-past-the-post voting, the British electoral system, has long increased the likelihood of a single party gaining a majority of Members of Parliament, who have run most departments and the government legislation of the country since the early 20th century.

After the formation of clear political parties in the Lords and Commons, the first national unity government came in response to the Napoleonic Wars. William Pitt the Younger offered to replace Prime Minister Henry Addington's government with a cabinet including all of the major parliamentary leaders such as himself, Charles James Fox, and Lord Grenville. This proved impossible because of irreconcilable policy differences between the factions (including Fox's opposition to the war in general), Fox's intense animosity towards Pitt the Younger, and King George III's refusal to appoint a government including Fox. After the death of Pitt the Younger in 1806, King George finally acquiesced and allowed Grenville and Fox to form a new "Ministry of All the Talents." This ministry had cross-party support, ranging from very socially conservative Tories, and the broad range of Whigs (among them Charles James Fox and the Foxites as well as Grenvillites), selected for their combined broad political support in both Houses of Parliament and known capabilities in a time of crisis. However, the ministry was frustrated in its attempts to make peace with the First French Empire, and despite one major legislative success (the Slave Trade Act 1807 banning the Atlantic slave trade in the British Empire), it fell apart in 1807 over the question of Catholic Emancipation and was replaced following a general election by a Tory ministry led by the Duke of Portland.

The world wars and the long recovery to the Great Depression would be the only further instances of National Governments. The next major government representing all parties came during World War II after the Norway Debate, in which Prime Minister Neville Chamberlain and his cabinet were condemned for their handling of the war and faced a vote of no confidence in which members of his own party voted with the Opposition against him. The debate also revealed that Winston Churchill, an early opponent of Nazi Germany and appeasement, would be the only Conservative minister under which both Labour and Conservative MPs would join a government. Churchill agreed to form a new government after Chamberlain resigned. The subsequent Churchill war ministry included Churchill as prime minister, Labour Party Leader Clement Attlee as deputy prime minister, Conservative Party Leader Chamberlain as Lord President of the Council, and Liberal leader Archibald Sinclair as Secretary of State for Air.

==== Quasi-national governments ====
After 10 years of rule by the Liberal Party, Prime Minister H. H. Asquith agreed to form a new coalition ministry with the Conservative Party in response to World War I in 1915. However, the government remained dominated by the Liberals with few Conservatives in important Cabinet posts. Asquith resigned as Conservatives refused to serve in his government in 1916, and David Lloyd George and Conservative Party Leader Bonar Law formed a new coalition government from Conservatives and a minority of Liberals opposed to Asquith's handling of the war, which was opposed by Asquith's Liberals. In the 1918 general election held after the end of the war, Coalition-endorsed candidates won a large majority. Thereafter a coalition that faced few opposition MPs under David Lloyd George lasted until 1922 when, at the Carlton Club meeting, Conservative backbenchers declared that the party would fight the forthcoming election with its own leader and programme.

During the Great Depression the first of four consecutive National Governments was formed in 1931 by Ramsay MacDonald (Labour/National Labour) succeeded by Stanley Baldwin (Conservative) with their largest opponent and the Liberals. Most members of the Labour and Liberal Parties rejected the government, however, and moved to the opposition benches leaving MacDonald's supporters to rival mainstream party candidates in many cases as National Labour/National Labour Organisation or in the Liberal National Party. Notably candidates styled in this way contested the 1935 election; this long period of quasi-national government took in broader support and widened its selections of ministers in the war years, and its fourth transmutation persisted until the general election of 1945.

In 2019, the idea of a government of National Unity was proposed by politicians including Labour leader Jeremy Corbyn and Liberal Democrats leader Jo Swinson to stop a no-deal Brexit spearheaded by Prime Minister Boris Johnson.

==== Northern Ireland ====
The Belfast Agreement, which sets out the workings of the Northern Ireland Assembly, effectively enforces all-party governments in Northern Ireland. All governments formed since the foundation of the Northern Ireland Executive in 1999 have contained ministers from the five main parties (Sinn Féin, Democratic Unionist Party, Ulster Unionist Party, Social Democratic and Labour Party and Alliance), with seats allocated using the d'Hondt method.

=== United States ===
In hopes of bridging partisan politics during the American Civil War, Republican Abraham Lincoln ran for his second term under the new National Union Party with Democrat Andrew Johnson as his running mate. The National Union Party allowed members to retain affiliations with other political parties.

Since the Civil War, there has never been a "national unity" government in the United States in the traditional sense. There have been several instances, however, during national disasters or wars, that the two parties have briefly "rallied around the President". Such instances include the attack on Pearl Harbor, the assassination of John F. Kennedy, and the September 11 attacks, all of which not only had a worldwide effect, but preceded a massive spike in the approval rating of the sitting president.

=== Zimbabwe ===
The 2008–2009 Zimbabwean political negotiations between the opposition Movement for Democratic Change (led by Morgan Tsvangirai), its small splinter group, the Movement for Democratic Change – Mutambara (led by Arthur Mutambara), and the ruling Zimbabwe African National Union – Patriotic Front (led by Robert Mugabe) created a framework for a power-sharing executive government between the two parties. These negotiations followed the 2008 presidential election, in which Mugabe was controversially re-elected, as well as the 2008 parliamentary election, in which the MDC won a majority in the House of Assembly. The new national unity government, including Tsvangirai, was sworn in on 11 February 2009.

== See also ==
- Grand coalition
- Unity ticket
- Cabinet of Franjo Gregurić in Croatia
- Government of National Unity (Hungary)
- Polish National Government
- Puntofijo Pact
