= David Lam =

Canadian businessman (1923–2010)

The Honourable David See-chai Lam OC CVO OBC
- 林思齊

25th Lieutenant Governor of British Columbia
- In office September 9, 1988 – April 21, 1995
- Monarch: Elizabeth II
- Governors General: Jeanne Sauvé; Ray Hnatyshyn; Roméo LeBlanc
- Premier: Bill Vander Zalm; Rita Johnston; Mike Harcourt
- Preceded by: Robert Gordon Rogers
- Succeeded by: Garde Gardom

Personal details
- Born: July 25, 1923 British Hong Kong
- Died: November 22, 2010 (aged 87) Vancouver, British Columbia, Canada
- Cause of death: Prostate cancer
- Spouse: Dorothy Lam (m. 1954; died 1997)
- Children: 3
- Education: Lingnan University; Temple University

David See-chai Lam, OC CVO OBC (Chinese: 林思齊; July 25, 1923 – November 22, 2010) was a Hong Kong-born Canadian banker, businessman, investor, philanthropist, and politician. From 1988 to 1995, Lam was the 25th Lieutenant Governor of British Columbia, and he was the first Chinese Canadian to be appointed as a viceroy in Canada. He was known for his charitable efforts, donating millions of dollars and leveraging millions more to support educational institutions and activities in Hong Kong, Canada, and the United States.

== Early life ==
David See-chai Lam was born in Hong Kong on July 25, 1923; he was the second oldest of nine children of Lam Chi Fung, a Hong Kong coal importer and distributor, and Chan Chik-Ting Lam. When Lam turned 18, his plans to attend university were sidelined by World War II. During the war, he worked in the administration of the family’s coal business, and his life was often at risk. Among the close calls, Lam was bombed at a dock, chased by pirates, and opted not to board a ship that was later torpedoed. Understanding the danger, Chi Fung decided it was time for Lam to undertake his university studies.

In 1947, Lam earned a degree in economics from Lingnan University in Hong Kong. He developed fluency in five languages, and earned an MBA degree from Temple University in the United States. He returned to Hong Kong in 1949 and began a successful career in his family's banking business at Ka Wah Bank. While dancing at a ball, Lam met his future wife, Dorothy. They dated for two years, and married in the fall of 1954. Together they had three daughters: Deborah, Daphne, and Doreen. After working as a banker for 18 years, Lam and his family immigrated to Vancouver in 1967.

== Career ==
Lam became a prominent real estate entrepreneur in Vancouver, and was a leading proponent of many groundbreaking real estate development ventures. The company he founded is now known as Pacific Canadian Investments (PCI). He is also noted for being a leading philanthropist. He founded the Floribunda Philanthropic Society, and the David & Dorothy Lam Foundation. He donated substantial funds to cultural projects in his adopted province and country. He served as Chairman of Hong Kong Baptist College, trustee of the Chancellor's Circle at the University of British Columbia, which later awarded him an honorary degree, and was a benefactor to the David C. Lam Institute for East-West Studies at Hong Kong Baptist University. In 1986, he helped found the Canadian International Dragon Boat Festival.

=== Lieutenant governor ===
In 1988 Governor General Jeanne Sauvé, on the advice of Prime Minister Brian Mulroney, appointed him lieutenant governor. Lam represented the Crown during the term of three Premiers: William Vander Zalm, Rita Johnston, and Michael Harcourt.

He formally ended the practice of lieutenant governors wearing the Windsor uniform. This practice was reinstated by Lieutenant Governor Steven Point.

Lam was Canada's second non-white lieutenant governor (the first being Lincoln Alexander of Ontario) and was the first Asian Canadian as well as the first Chinese Canadian lieutenant governor.

== Honours ==
- In 1988, he was made a Knight of Justice of the Order of St. John and Vice-Prior of the Order from 1988 to 1995.
- In 1988, he was made a Member of the Order of Canada and was promoted to Officer in 1995.
- In 1994, he was made a Commander of the Royal Victorian Order (CVO) by the Queen in 1994.
- In 1995, he was awarded the Order of British Columbia.
- In 1995, David Lam Park in Vancouver, BC was named after him.

== Death ==
Lam died on November 22, 2010, from prostate cancer at the age of 87. He was predeceased by his wife of 43 years, Dorothy, who died in 1997, and survived by three children and seven grandchildren.

== Arms ==
Coat of arms of David Lam
Notes The arms of David Lam consist of: Crest Above a helmet mantled Gules doubled Or on a wreath Or and Gules an Antique Crown Or garnished with jade proper issuant therefrom a demi lion Or holding between his forepaws a jade ball proper. Escutcheon Gules a Chinese dragon Or reaching for a pearl Argent on a chief Or a Latin cross Gules between two pine trees Vert. Supporters Two horses Argent langued Gules unguled Or gorged with antique crown Or garnished with jade proper each horse holding a gonfalon Argent inscribed in Chinese characters Sable. Compartment A rocky promontory proper charged with three Pacific Dogwood flowers Argent leaved Vert seeded Or. Motto Futura Aspirans

== See also ==
- Lam Chi-fung
