= Hong Kong Baptist Hospital =

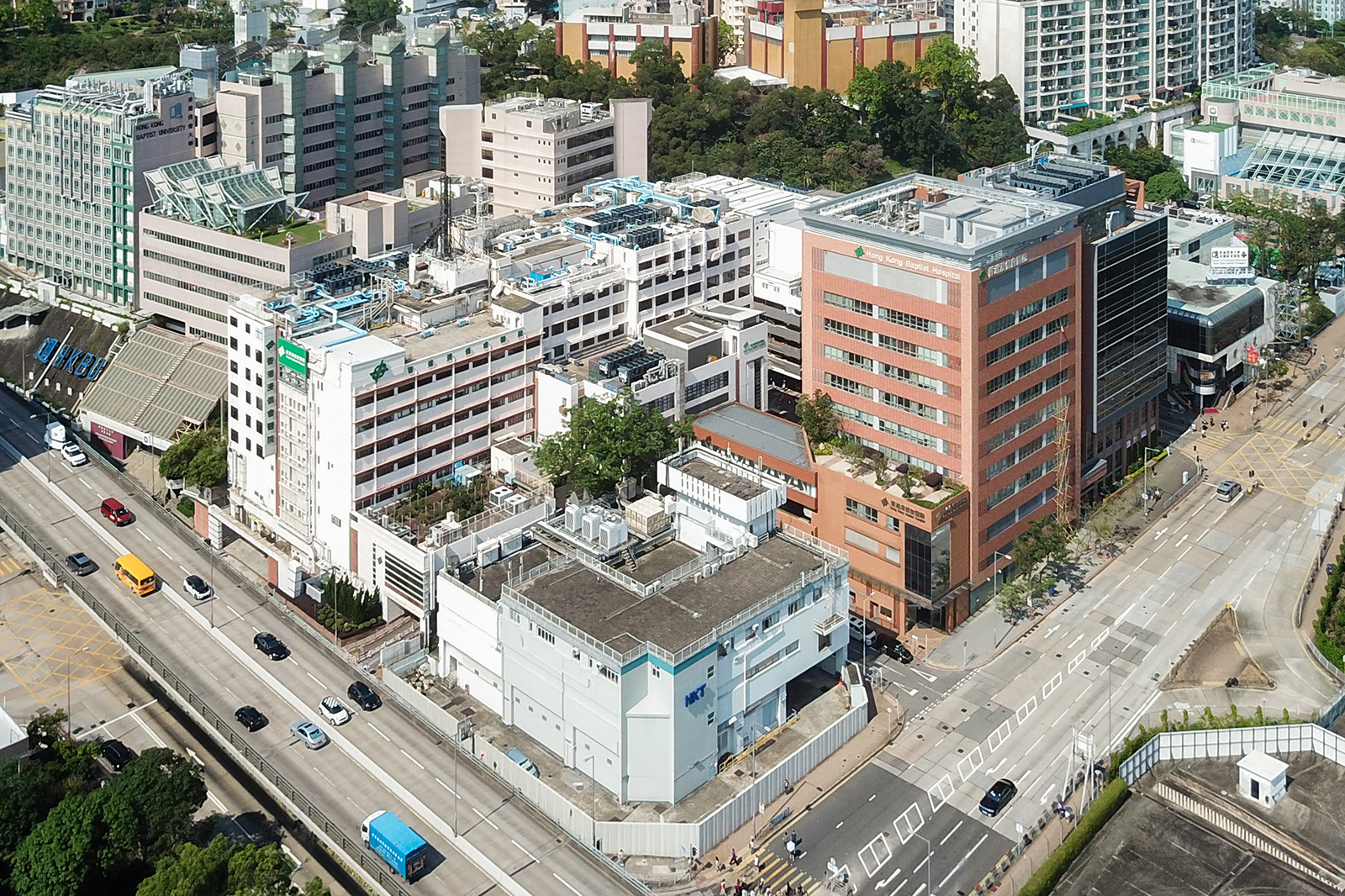
- Hong Kong Baptist Hospital

- Location within Hong Kong

Geography
- Location: 222 Waterloo Road, Kowloon Tong, Kowloon, Hong Kong
- Coordinates: 22°20′24″N 114°10′48″E

Organisation
- Care system: Private
- Type: District General, Teaching
- Religious affiliation: Baptist

Services
- Emergency department: No Accident & Emergency
- Beds: 860

History
- Founded: 1963; 63 years ago

Links
- Website: www.hkbh.org.hk
- Lists: Hospitals in Hong Kong

Hong Kong Baptist Hospital (HKBH) is a private Baptist hospital based in Kowloon Tong, Kowloon City District, Kowloon, Hong Kong. It is affiliated with the Baptist Convention of Hong Kong.

== History ==
The hospital started as an outpatient clinic founded by the Baptist Convention of Hong Kong in 1956 and evolved into a general hospital in 1963. In 1983, it opened a nursing school. In 2020, it opened the Ambulatory Medical Centre. In 2021, it received two Healthcare Asia Awards for Covid Management Initiative of the Year and Hospital of the Year. In 2023, he received an HMA Award in the “talent development” category. » In 2024, it announced an expansion project to multiply its surface area by 1.65. In 2024, it had 860 beds.

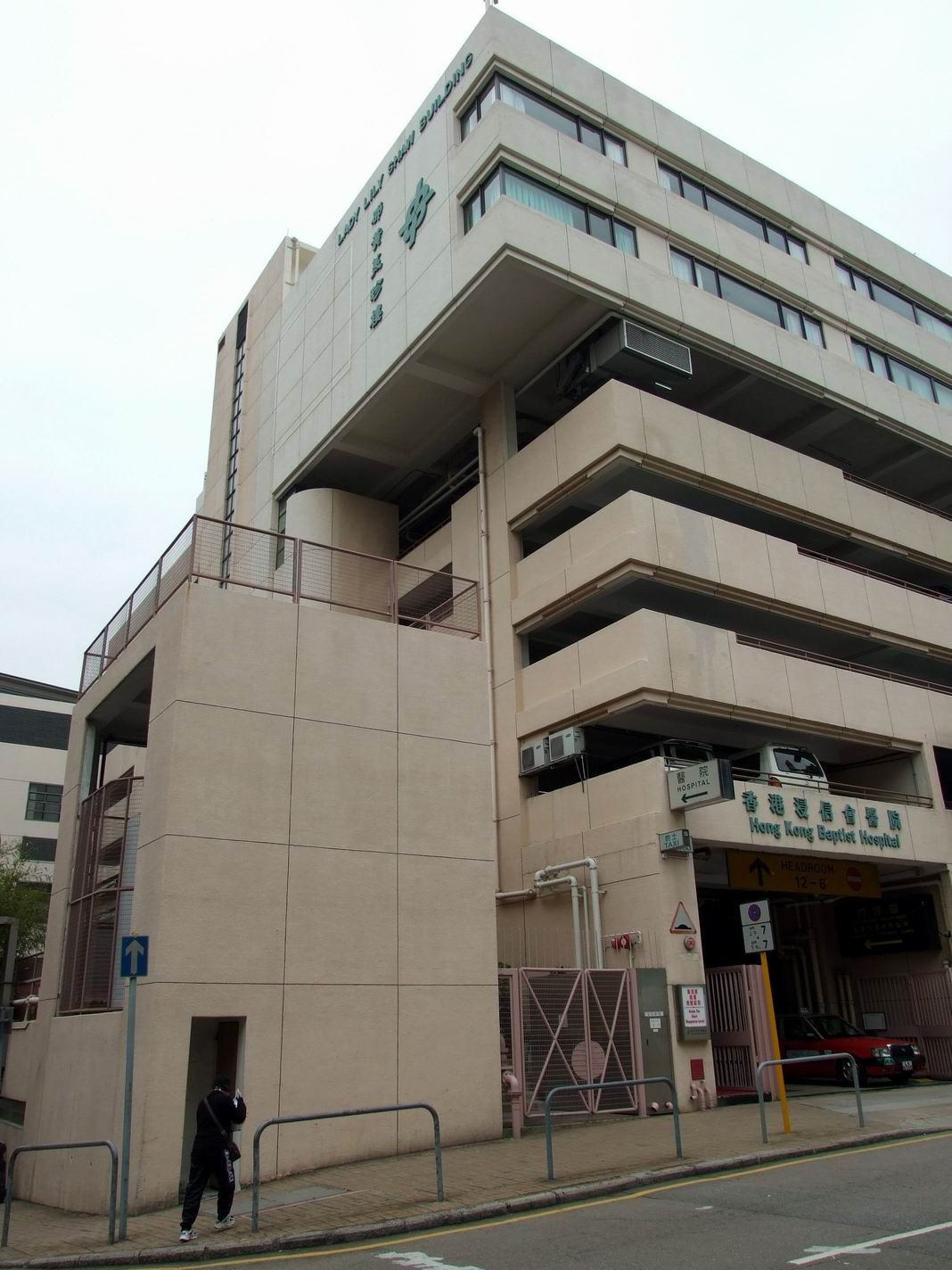
Lady Lily Shaw Building, Hong Kong Baptist Hospital

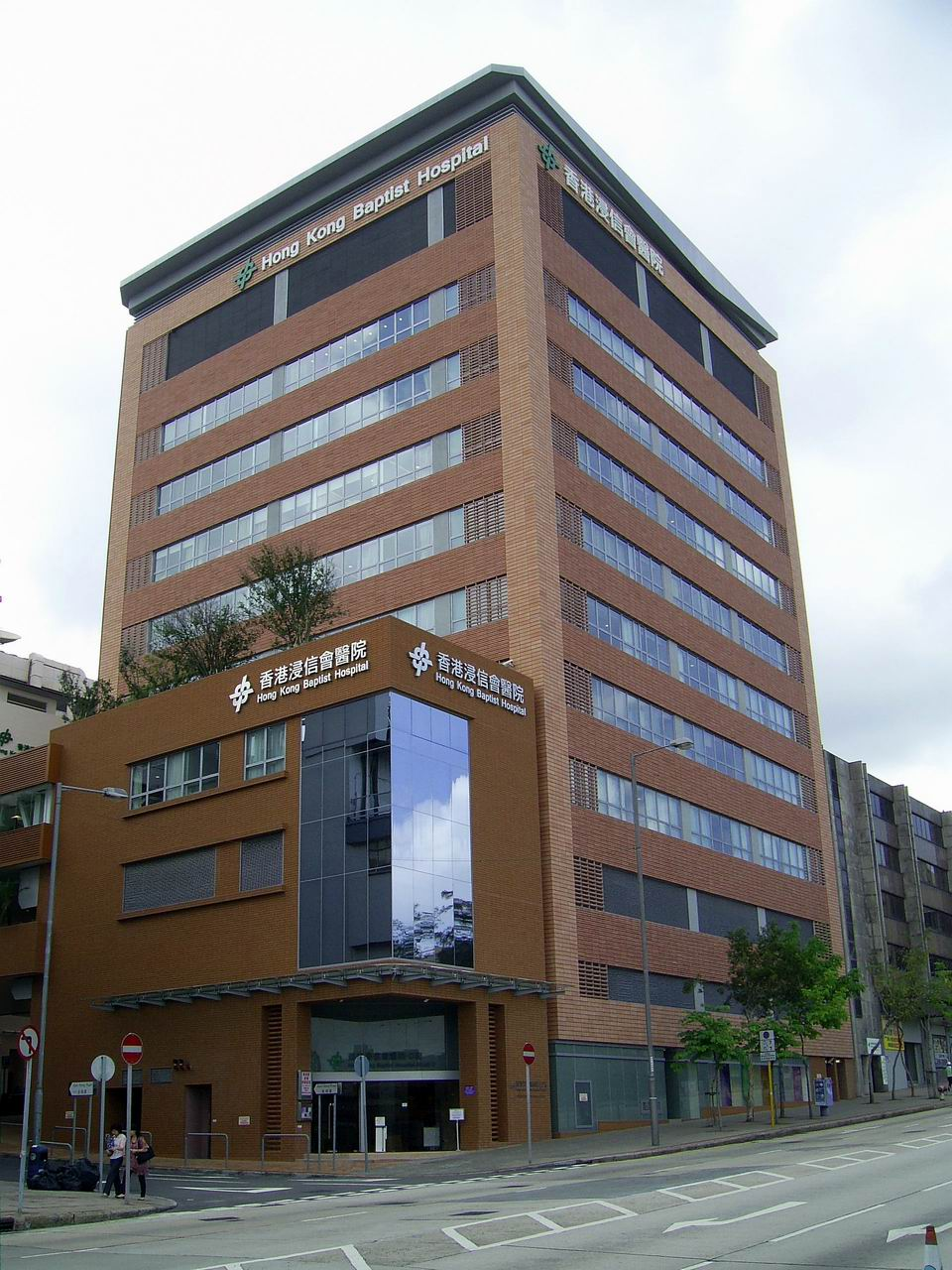
New Block D, Hong Kong Baptist Hospital

== See also ==
- List of hospitals in Hong Kong
