= Baptist Convention of Hong Kong =

Baptist Christian denomination in Hong Kong

- Traditional Chinese: 香港浸信會聯會
Transcriptions
Standard Mandarin
- Hanyu Pinyin: xiāng gǎng jìn xìn huì lián huì
Yue: Cantonese
- Jyutping: hoeng1 gong2 zam3 seon3 wui6 lyun4 wui6

Baptist Convention of Hong Kong
- Classification: Evangelical Christianity
- Theology: Baptist
- Associations: Asia Pacific Baptist Federation, Baptist World Alliance
- Headquarters: Mong Kok, Hong Kong
- Origin: 1938
- Congregations: 164
- Members: 114,016
- Hospitals: 1
- Seminaries: Hong Kong Baptist Theological Seminary
- Official website: hkbaptist.org.hk

The Baptist Convention of Hong Kong is a Baptist Christian denomination in Hong Kong. It is affiliated with the Baptist World Alliance. The headquarters is in Mong Kok.

== History ==
=== Background ===
Baptist work in Hong Kong traces its roots from the first missionaries sent by the Triennial Convention to work with the Chinese. Due to the hostility to foreigners in China at that time, missionaries were forced to work in areas with significant Chinese population in territories outside of Chinese control. In 1835, Dr. and Mrs. William Dean begun work with the Chaozhou speaking Chinese in Bangkok, Thailand whereas the Revd. Jehu Lewis Shuck and his wife, Henrietta Shuck, started work among the Cantonese speaking Chinese in Portuguese ruled Macau.

=== Initial mission work ===
With the cession of Hong Kong to the United Kingdom in 1842, the Shucks relocated to the colony in March of the same year and were joined later in the year by the Deans. The first chapel was established in 1842 in Queen's Road known as the Queen's Road Baptist Church. The Shucks also established a school for Chinese children where Henrietta served as director until her death in 1844. They were also joined by Issachar Jacox Roberts who preached extensively in the villages of Hong Kong, particularly in the village of Chek Chue (known today as Stanley). In the same year, Roberts relocated to Canton becoming the first European to reside outside the protected foreign factory as European compounds were known then.

=== Consolidation ===
Mission work among the Cantonese was temporarily halted in 1845 when Shuck returned to the United States although Chaozhou language work continued among transient emigrant coolies with the Deans who were later joined by John W. Johnson and William Ashmore in 1860. With the help of one of the first baptised convert, Chen Dui, a second Chaozhou congregation was established in Cheung Chau Island among the permanent residents.

With the transfer of the Chaozhou mission to Shantou in 1861, the older congregation in Queen's Road closed down but the Cheung Chau congregation remained open, led by local Chinese leaders. Work was resumed among Cantonese speakers with the return of Johnson to Hong Kong in 1880 and by 1901, the Self-Governing Hong Kong Baptist Church (香港浸信自理會) was established.

=== BCHK established ===
On 27 March 1938, the Caine Road Baptist Church (香港浸信教會), Cheung Chau Baptist Church (長洲浸信會), Aberdeen Baptist Church (香港仔浸信會), together with the outreach points at Yau Ma Tei (油麻地佈道所), Hung Hom (紅鋤佈道所) and Kowloon City (九龍城佈道所), together established the BCHK.

With the establishment of the People's Republic of China in 1949, many refugees entered Hong Kong, including Christians from the Baptist churches in China. This helped in the expansion of the work of the BCHK. This included Chaozhou speaking Baptists affiliated with the mission established by William Dean who set up the Hong Kong Swatow Baptist Church in 1948. In 1954, Chaozhou speaking missionaries were sent by the American Baptist Foreign Mission Society at the request of local workers to help in the work and the Chaozhou speaking churches, collectively known as the Swatow Baptist Churches (later Shantou Baptist Churches) joined the BCHK. According to a census published by the association in 2023, it claimed 164 churches and 114,016 members.

== Ministries ==
=== Schools ===
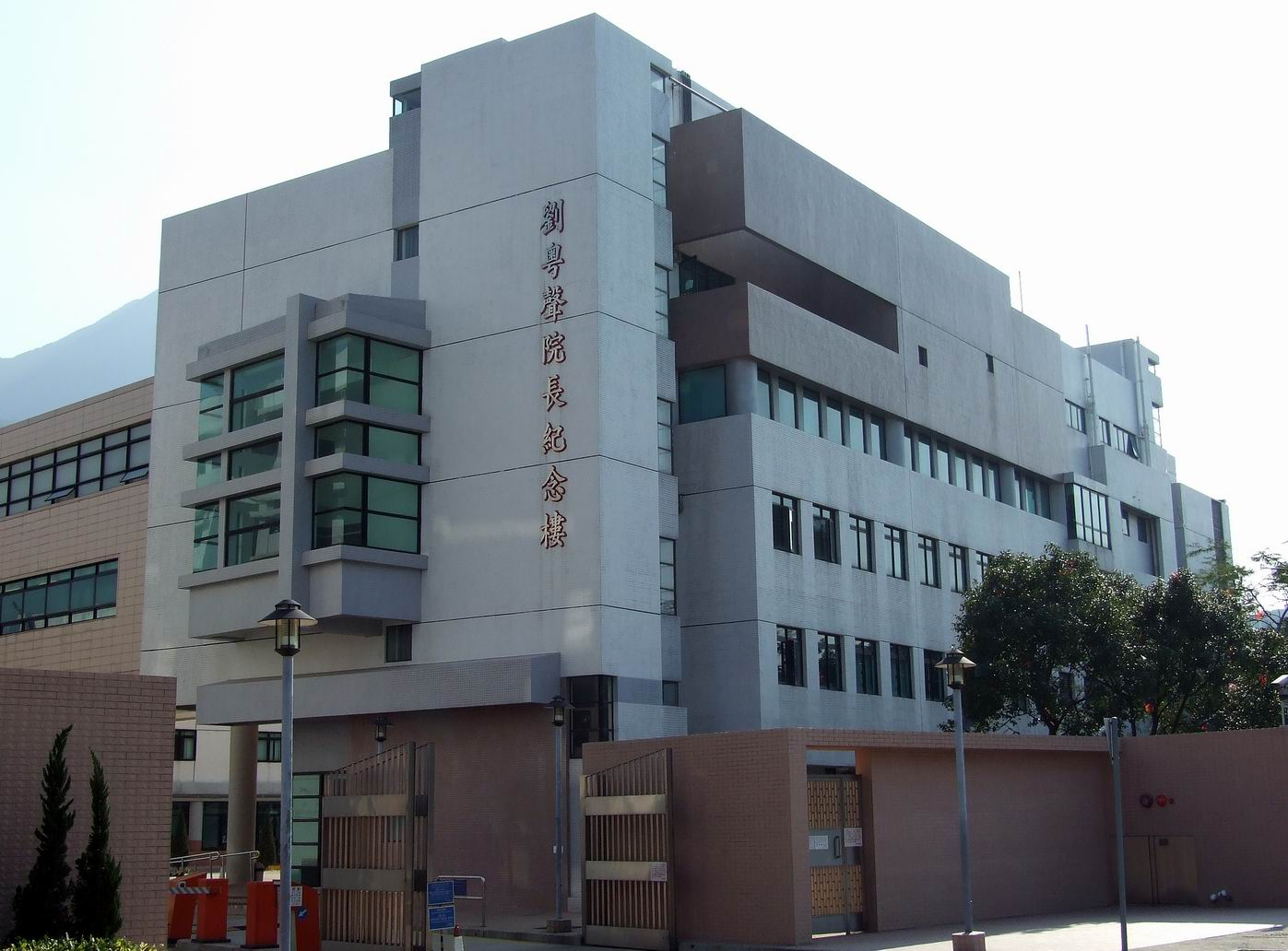
Hong Kong Baptist Theological Seminary.

The first school was established by Henrietta Shuck but it did not survive her death. In 1933, a branch of Canton's Pui Ching Middle School was established in Ho Man Tin (何文田). By 1998, a total of 31 kindergartens, 7 primary schools, and 8 secondary schools have been established by the BCHK.

In September 1956, the Hong Kong Baptist College was established as a successor institution to the Kwangtung and Kwangsi Baptist University and classes commenced from borrowed facilities at the Pui Ching Middle School. Dr. Lam Chi-Fung became the college's first president. In 1959, the groundbreaking ceremony was held for the college's permanent campus at Waterloo Road. In 1966, the campus was finally completed and named the Ho Sin Sang Campus (善衡校園). In 1994, the college was granted university status and became known as the Hong Kong Baptist University, making it the first church operated university in China since 1949.

The Hong Kong Baptist Theological Seminary was established in 1951. The Revd. Lau Yuet-sing served as the seminary's first president. The campus was originally located in Pok Oi Estate but was relocated to larger premises at Ho Man Tin in 1958. It relocated to its current campus in Sai O, Shap Sze Heung, Sai Kung (North) in 1999.

=== Medical ===
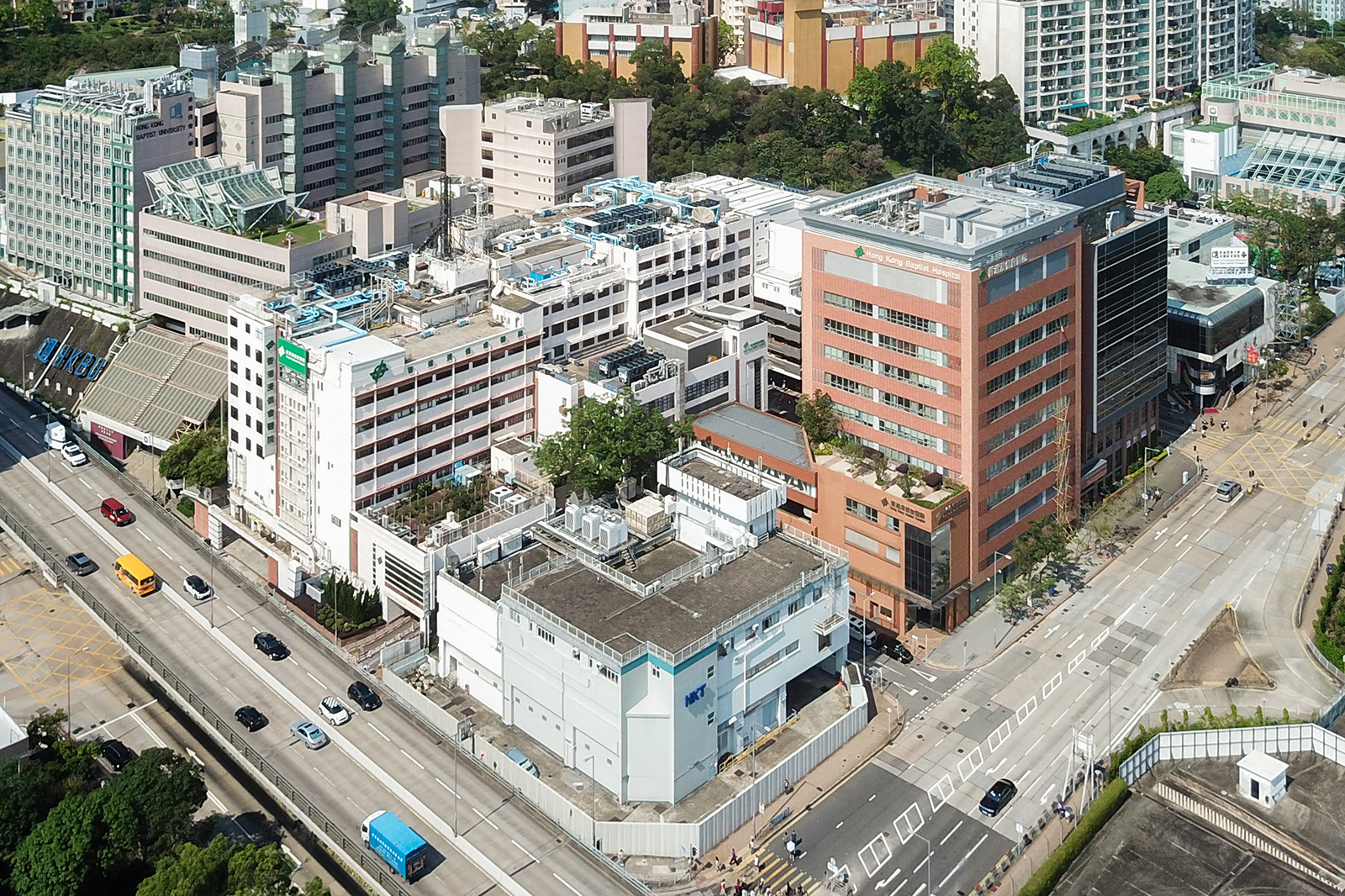
Hong Kong Baptist Hospital.

The convention founded the Hong Kong Baptist Hospital in 1963.

== Affiliations ==
The BCHK is a member of the Baptist World Alliance and the Asia Pacific Baptist Federation.

== See also ==
- Christianity in China
- Christianity in Hong Kong
- Hong Kong Baptist University
- Asia Pacific Baptist Federation
- Bible
- Born again
- Baptist beliefs
- Jesus Christ
- Believers' Church
- Lam Chi-fung
