= Ka Wah Bank =

Privatized bank located in Hong Kong

Ka Wah Bank Limited
- Native name: 嘉華銀行有限公司
- Type: Formerly a Public company
- Traded as: Formerly SEHK: 183
- Industry: Financial services
- Founded: 1923
- Founder: Dr. Lam Chi Fung
- Defunct: 1998
- Fate: Acquired by CITIC Group
- Successor: China CITIC Bank International
- Headquarters: Hong Kong
- Products: Retail banking, Commercial banking
- Parent: CITIC Group

Ka Wah Bank (Chinese: 嘉華銀行有限公司) was a Hong Kong–based bank that operated between 1923 and 1998 when it was acquired by CITIC Group.

In 1998, the bank was acquired by CITIC International Financial Holdings and renamed as CITIC Ka Wah Bank Limited (中信嘉華銀行有限公司) and then in May 2010, CITIC Ka Wah Bank Limited was renamed as China CITIC Bank International.

== History ==
The bank was founded in 1923 as Ka Wah Ngan Ho (嘉華銀號) in Guangzhou by Dr. Lam Chi Fung, the founding president of Hong Kong Baptist College. Its name, Ka Wah, was derived from the names of Ka Nam Tong and Nam Wah Company.

In 1926 Ka Wah Savings Bank Limited (嘉華儲蓄銀行有限公司) was founded in Hong Kong. Ka Wah Ngan Ho in Guangzhou then became Ka Wah Savings Bank's Guangzhou Branch. That same year the bank was renamed as Ka Wah Bank Public Limited Company (嘉華銀行公眾有限公司).

In 1931 the bank established a Shanghai branch. During the World War II period the branches in Shanghai and Guangzhou were closed. The Hong Kong branch was reopened in 1945 and in 1949 the bank was renamed as Ka Wah Bank Limited.

C.S. Low (Low Chung Song, 刘灿松), a Singapore businessman and banker, led a takeover of Ka Wah Bank in December 1974 from a group of U.S. investors. He became the bank's largest shareholder. After the takeover business expanded rapidly.

In 1980 the bank was listed on the Hong Kong Stock Exchange. Underwritten by Chase Manhattan Asia. Between 1975 and 1983, the bank's net earnings rose by about 2,200%.

In 1986 the bank suffered financial difficulties, and CITIC Group injected HK$350 million capital into the bank. In 1998 the bank was renamed as CITIC Ka Wah Bank Limited.

In 2002 CITIC Ka Wah Bank was privatized by CITIC International Financial Holdings and it became a whole-owned subsidiary of CITIC International Financial Holdings.

In May 2010, the bank was renamed again as China CITIC Bank International.

== See also ==
- CITIC Ka Wah Bank
- David Lam See-chai, one of nine children of Lam Chi Fung who later moved to Canada and became the Lieutenant Governor of British Columbia
