= Polish National Government =

Polish National Government (Polish: Rząd Narodowy) can refer to:

- Polish National Government (November Uprising) (1831)
- Polish National Government (Kraków Uprising) (1846)
- Polish National Government (January Uprising) (1863–1864), also known as Temporary National Government for part of that period
- Polish National Government (Vienna) (1877)
