= Pui Ching Middle School (Hong Kong) =

Secondary school in Kowloon, Hong Kong

Coordinates: 22.3173°N 114.1767°E

- 香港培正中學
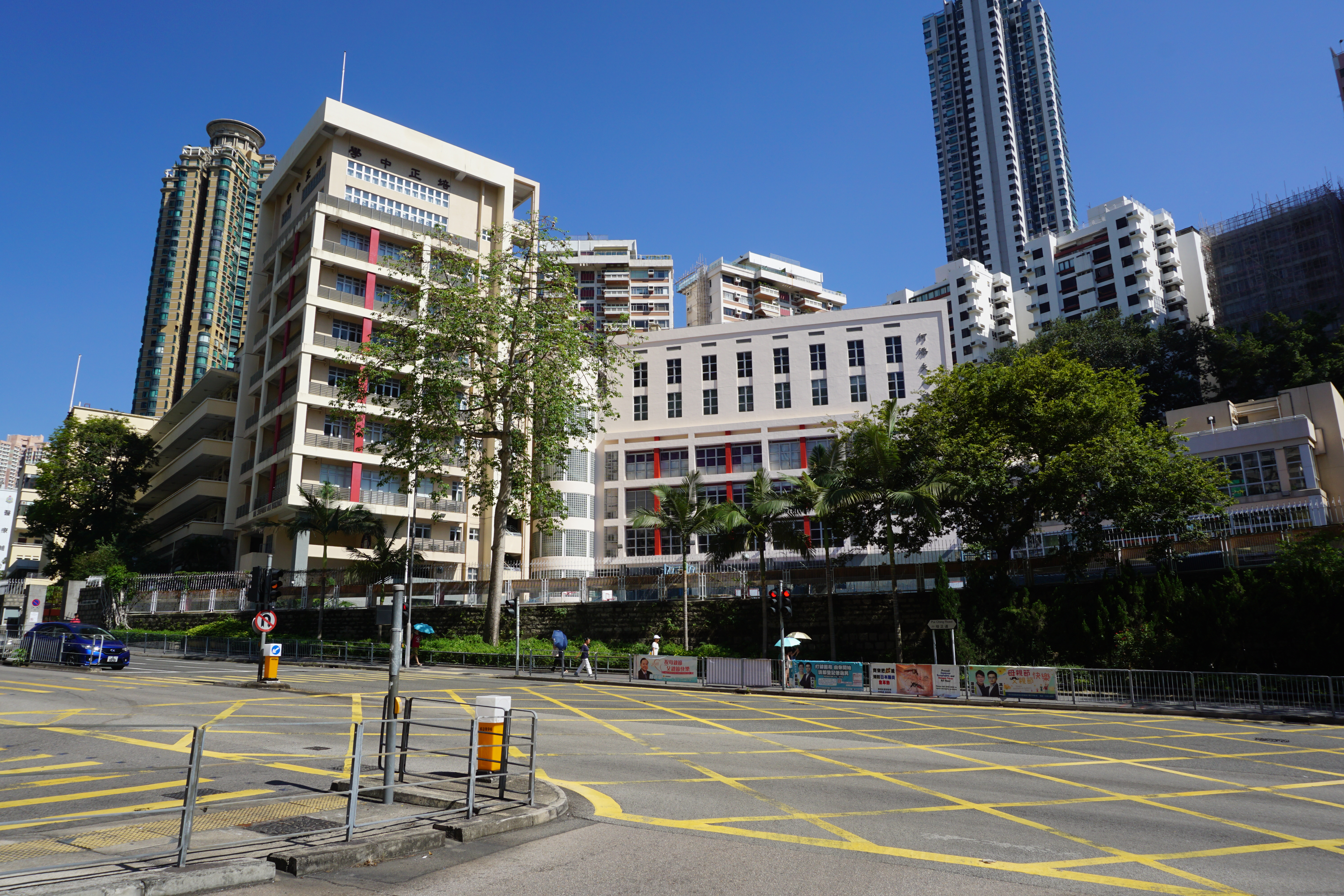
- Pui Ching Middle School in 2018

Location
- 20 Pui Ching Road; Ho Man Tin, Kowloon; Hong Kong

Information
- School type: Aided Secondary, Co‑educational
- Motto: Be Good and Right (至善至正)
- Religious affiliation: Christian
- Established: 1889; 137 years ago
- School district: Kowloon City
- Chairperson: HO Kin Chung 何建宗
- Principal: Nick Ho 何力高
- Teaching staff: 77
- Grades: Secondary 1–6
- Enrollment: 1100
- Classes: 36
- Language: Cantonese, English, Mandarin
- Campus size: ≈15,000 m^{2}
- Colours: Red and Blue
- Affiliation: Baptist Convention of Hong Kong
- Nobel laureates: 1
- Website: Pui Ching Middle School; Pui Ching i‑Community

Pui Ching Middle School
- Traditional Chinese: 香港培正中學
Transcriptions
Yue: Cantonese
- Yale Romanization: hēung góng pùih jing jūng hohk
- Jyutping: hoeng1 gong2 pui4 zing3 zung1 hok6

Pui Ching Middle School (Chinese: 香港培正中學) is a Baptist secondary school in Ho Man Tin, Kowloon, Hong Kong. Founded in 1889, it currently has sister schools in Macau and Guangzhou.

== History ==
The Hong Kong branch was established in 1933 in Ho Man Tin. Initially, only primary school education was offered; a junior high school division using Chinese as medium of instruction was established in 1938, a senior high division was established in 1940. The school was suspended during Japanese occupation of Hong Kong during World War II. Students and staff went to Macau and mainland China. In 1945, the school moved back to a temporary site in Kowloon Tong and in 1946, the school moved back to Ho Man Tin. In 1950, the school was renamed from a Hong Kong branch of the Canton school to the present name. In 1952, a new extension on the land donated by Hong Kong Government was built and completed in September 1953. The premises are located at 20 Pui Ching Road which was named after the school.

== Motto and Colours ==
The school motto, "Utmost Goodness and Righteousness" (至善至正), was adopted in 1916. It is derived from passages in the Old Testament: Deuteronomy 12:28 ("you will be doing what is good and right in the eyes of the Lord your God.";「行耶和華你神眼中看為善為正的事」) and Psalm 25:8 ("Good and upright is the Lord; therefore he instructs sinners in his ways";「耶和華是良善正直的」).

The school colours, red and blue, were introduced in 1917 when the school flag was first designed. According to the school, red symbolises passion and enthusiasm, while blue represents calmness and thoughtful planning.

== Today ==
Pui Ching Middle School uses Chinese as its primary medium of instruction, with English used in certain subjects. It is an aided co-educational secondary school, offering classes from Form 1 to Form 6. The school operates 36 classes with a total enrolment of more than 1,100 students.

== Notable alumni ==
- Daniel Chee Tsui, 崔琦, Nobel Prize Laureate in Physics, 1998.
- Shing-Tung Yau, 丘成桐, mathematician, awarded the Fields Medal in 1982. Calabi–Yau manifold was named after him. Awarded Wolf Prize in Mathematics in 2010.
- Alfred Y. Cho, 卓以和, father of molecular beam epitaxy and quantum cascade lasers. former Vice President of Semiconductor Research at Bell Labs, Awarded US National Medal of Science in 1993 and US National Medal of Technology in 2007. Inducted into the US National Inventors Hall of Fame in 2009.
- Yum-Tong Siu, 蕭蔭堂, mathematician, William Elwood Byerly Professor of Mathematics, Harvard University
- Shiu-Yuen Cheng, 鄭紹遠, former Dean of Science of the Hong Kong University of Science and Technology, now Chair Professor of Mathematics at Hong Kong University of Science and Technology
- Sun Kwok, 郭新, founder of Interactive Wind Model in Planetary Nebula, Dean of Science of University of Hong Kong
- Chia-Wei Woo, 吳家瑋, founding President of the Hong Kong University of Science and Technology
- King-Fai Chung, 鍾景輝, first dean, the Hong Kong Academy for the Performing Arts. BBS
- Paul Tsai-Pao Wong, 王载宝, founding director of Graduate Program in Counselling Psychology at Trinity Western University and president of the International Network on Personal Meaning
- Daniel Tse Chi-wai, 謝志偉, former President of Hong Kong Baptist University
- Ng Ching-fai, 吳清渾, former President of Hong Kong Baptist University
- John Hung, 洪𠄘禧, former chairman, Wheelock & Co, former executive director, Wharf Holdings
- Joseph King-Tak Lee, M.D., Chairman Emeritus and Dr. Ernest H. Wood Distinguished Professor of Radiology, Department of Radiology University of North Carolina at Chapel Hill. Author of Computed Body Tomography with MRI Correlation.
- Kwing Lam Chan, 陳炯林, Dean of Space Science Institute and Director of Lunar and Planetary Science Laboratory, Macau University of Science and Technology, Head of the Department of Mathematics, Hong Kong University of Science and Technology, Application Research Scientist, China Chang'E Lunar Exploration.
- Chung-Kong Chow, 周松崗, former CEO of Hong Kong MTR; chairman, Hong Kong Stock Exchange
- Henry Tang, 唐英年, former Chief Secretary of the Hong Kong SAR Government
- Ian Huang, 黃源源, former Visiting Chief Architect, Singapore National Science & Technology Board (A*STAR), Co-inventor of [[SCSI (Small Computer System Interface) and FDDI (Fiber Distributed Data Interface)]].
- Edmond Ko, 高彥鳴, former senior advisor to the Provost, Director of the Center for Engineering Education Innovation at Hong Kong University for Science & Technology; former Vice Provost, Carnegie Mellon University; former vice president, City University of Hong Kong.
- Siu-Weng Simon Wong 黃兆永, former & founding CEO, Hong Kong Applied Science and Technology Research Institute (ASTRI)
- Simon Peh Yun Lu 白韞六, Commissioner, Independent Commission Against Corruption; former Director of Immigration Department Hong Kong.
- Wong Jing, 王晶, film director, producer, and screenwriter in Hong Kong
- Regina Tsang 曾慶瑜, Third Place 季军, Miss Hong Kong Pageant 1978
- Maria Wai-Bing Chung 鍾慧冰, Third Place 季军, Miss Hong Kong Pageant 1979, Hong Kong movie director and actress
- Gigi Lai, 黎姿, Hong Kong actress
- Sammul Chan, 陳鍵鋒 (陳恩耀), Hong Kong actor
- Cindy Au, 歐倩怡, Hong Kong actress

== See also ==
- Pui Ching Middle School
- Education in Hong Kong
- List of schools in Hong Kong
- Pui Ching Invitational Mathematics Competition
