= Farooq Naeem =

British psychiatrist

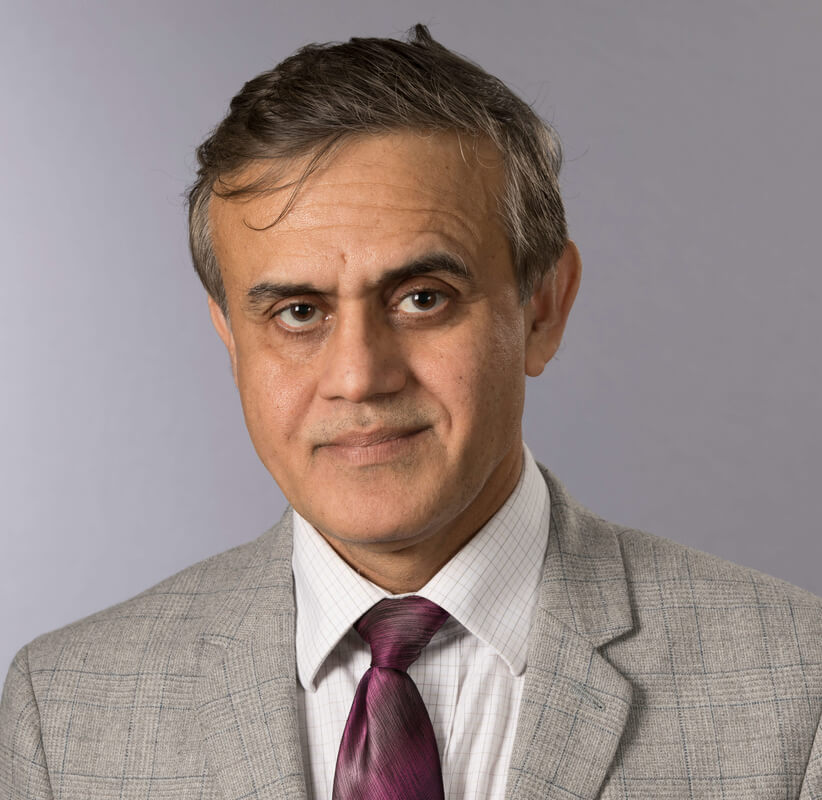
- Born: Farooq Naeem; September 28, 1965 (age 60); Rahim Yar Khan, Pakistan
- Education: King Edward Medical University; Royal College of Psychiatrists; Southampton University
- Scientific career
- Fields: Mental health
- Workplaces: University of Toronto
- Thesis: Adaptation of Cognitive Behaviour Therapy for depression in Pakistan: A methodology for adapting Cognitive Behavior Therapy in Non Western Cultures (2012)

Farooq Naeem is a British-Canadian academic of South Asian origin academic who is known for his work on cultural adaptation of cognitive behaviour therapy. He is also the founder of PACT (Pakistan Association of Cognitive Therapists). He is a professor of psychiatry at the University of Toronto, Toronto, Canada.

== Education ==
Farooq Naeem received his psychiatric training in the Merseyside training scheme, Liverpool, England. He later completed his MSc in research methods and Ph.D. from the University of Southampton, England. He completed his senior registrar training in Wessex. He is also a Cognitive Behaviour Therapist. In addition to CBT for common mental health disorders as he also received training in CBT for psychosis. In 2024, he completed a Master of Arts in Interreligious Dialogue (Comparative Theology): Science, Philosophy and Theology of Religions from Università della Svizzera italiana.

== Career and research work ==
Naeem's primary work is in global mental health. He pioneered techniques for culturally adapting CBT. The model was initially presented as Southampton Adaptation Framework and has evolved over the years. These techniques were used to adapt CBT for various common and severe mental health problems in South Asia, North Africa, the Middle East and China. Currently, the model is being used to adapt CBT for South Asians in Canada. More than 30 RCTs have used the adaptation methodology for a variety of problems and in different settings.

His Ph.D. project focused on culturally adapting CBT for clients from Non-Western cultures. He also developed culturally adapted self-help manuals that have been tested through RCTs.

His model of adaptation of CBT has been used to adapt DBT for those with learning disabilities in Kingston, Ontario. He recently received funding from Health Canada to adapt CBT for South Asians in Canada.

During his stay at Queens University, Canada, he evaluated the first CBTp based guided self-help for psychosis that he developed.

He established a low-intensity CBT service, "CBT Lite," at a community organization (AMHS-KFLA) in Kingston, Ontario. The service delivery model incorporated measurement of change in psychopathology and disability. He also supported the Structured Psychotherapy Program at the Centre for Addiction and Mental Health to develop a structured psychotherapy training program curriculum. In addition, he has advised Health Quality Ontario on developing Health Technology Assessments for CBT for psychosis and internet-delivered CBT. He is also a member of the Mental Health Commission of Canada's "think tank" to improve psychotherapies outcomes.

== Selected publications ==
- Li, Weihui; Zhang, Li; Luo, Xuerong; Liu, Bangshan; Liu, Zhipeng; Lin, Fang; Liu, Zhiling; Xie, Yuhuan; Hudson, Melissa; Rathod, Shanaya; Kingdon, David; Husain, Nusrat; Liu, Xudong; Ayub, Muhammad; Naeem, Farooq (2017). "A qualitative study to explore views of patients', carers' and mental health professionals' to inform cultural adaptation of CBT for psychosis (CBTP) in China". BMC Psychiatry. 17 (1) 131. doi:10.1186/s12888-017-1290-6. PMC 5385068. PMID 28390407.
- Trimmer, Chris; Tyo, Richard; Naeem, Farooq (2016). "Cognitive Behavioural Therapy-Based Music (CBT-Music) Group for Symptoms of Anxiety and Depression". Canadian Journal of Community Mental Health. 35 (2): 83–87. doi:10.7870/cjcmh-2016-029.
- Naeem, Farooq; Johal, Rupy; McKenna, Claire; Rathod, Shanaya; Ayub, Muhammad; Lecomte, Tania; Husain, Nusrat; Kingdon, David; Farooq, Saeed (2016). "Cognitive Behavior Therapy for psychosis based Guided Self-help (CBTP-GSH) delivered by frontline mental health professionals: Results of a feasibility study" (PDF). Schizophrenia Research. 173 (1–2): 69–74. doi:10.1016/j.schres.2016.03.003. PMID 26971071.
- Farooq Naeem, Muhammad Ayub, Muhammad Gobbi, David Kingdon. (2009). "Development of Southampton Adaptation Framework for CBT (SAF-CBT): a framework for adaptation of CBT in non-western culture". Journal of the Pakistan Psychiatric Society. 6(2): 79–84.
- Naeem, Farooq; Munshi, Tariq; Gratzer, David; Rodie, David; Irfan, Muhammad; Rao, Sanjay; Husain, Nusrat; Farooq, Saeed; Sanches, Marcos; Ayub, Muhammad; Lecomte, Tania (2019). "Video intervention for the psychiatric waiting room: Proof-of-concept randomised controlled trial of RESOLVE (Relaxation Exercise, SOLVing problem and cognitive Errors)". BJPsych Open. 5 (5) e77. doi:10.1192/bjo.2019.59. PMC 6737517. PMID 31488227.

== Awards and honours ==
- May 2025: Recognized as Global CBT Ambassador (Asia) by the World Confederation of Cognitive and Behavioural Therapies
- July 2021: Awarded the Lifetime achievement award by the International Network on Personal Meaning, Vancouver, Canada.
- May 2020: Awarded Academic Excellence in Psychotherapy award Department of Psychiatry, University of Toronto, Toronto.
- April 2020: Nominated Clinician of the year by Centre for Addiction and Mental Health, Toronto, Canada.
