= Bellagio Towers =

Bellagio Towers may refer to:

- Bellagio (Hong Kong)
- Bellagio (hotel and casino), Las Vegas
