= Anne Marden =

Anne Marden may refer to:

- Anne Marden (rower)
- Anne Marden (activist)
