= John Louis Marden =

British businessman and philanthropist

John Louis Marden CBE JP
- Born: 12 February 1919; United Kingdom
- Died: 18 March 1999 (aged 80); Shek O, Hong Kong SAR
- Education: University of Cambridge
- Occupations: Businessman and philanthropist
- Known for: Chairman of Wheelock Marden and co-founder of Marden Foundation
- Spouse: Anne Marden (m. 1946)
- Children: 4, one son and three daughters
- Parent: George Ernest Marden

John Louis Marden, CBE, JP (12 February 1919 – 18 March 1999) was a British businessman and philanthropist. He was the chairman of Wheelock Marden.

== Early life ==
John Louis Marden in February 1919 was born to George Marden, a former Imperial Maritime Customs officer in Canton and Shanghai and chairman of Wheelock Marden, the Far East conglomerate ranging from property and retailing to insurance and aviation. He was educated in Shanghai and then in England at Gresham's School and the University of Cambridge, graduating in economics and law.

== Career ==
After finishing university in 1946, Marden joined his father's firm as a trainee in the secretarial and shipping division before he was transferred to the insurance department. In 1952, he became a director of the company. In 1959 he succeeded his father as chairman of Wheelock and Marden, sometimes known as "taipan". As the chairman of one of the leading firms in Hong Kong, he sat on the boards of the Hongkong and Shanghai Banking Corporation, Dairy Farm, the Cross-Harbour Tunnel and Hongkong Electric Company, among many others. Sir David Akers-Jones, a former acting Governor, called "the taipan among the taipans". He was also an unofficial member of the Legislative Council of Hong Kong for a brief period in 1971.

In the 1970s, the four largest traditional British firms, Jardine Matheson, Swire, Hutchison, and Wheelock Marden, were all undergoing rapid decline and facing challenges from up and coming Hong Kong Chinese entrepreneurs. Douglas Clague lost control of Hutchison Whampoa in 1975 through disastrous speculation in foreign currency and on the stock market. In 1980 Jardine was outbid by shipping magnate Sir Yue-kong Pao for the Hongkong & Kowloon Wharf & Godown Company, in which the two groups had previously shared control, when the latter decided to diversify from shipping into property. The Hongkong Land faced a constant threat from Li Ka-shing's Cheung Kong Holdings and nearly went under in the early 1980s.

In the early 1980s when the economy was overshadowed by the political uncertainties of Hong Kong, Marden misread world shipping trends by registering his shipping fleets overseas. This led to the doldrums and mounting debts. In 1985, Marden had to surrender control of Wheelock Marden to Sir Yue-kong Pao, who defeated Malaysian Tan Sri Khoo Teck Puat in what was described at the time as a takeover battle "for the corporate soul of Hong Kong". As a result, Marden was replaced as Wheelock Marden chairman, after sixty years of family control.

== Personal life and death ==
He married rights advocate Anne Marden in 1946 and had one son and three daughters. The couple founded the Marden Foundation for charitable works in Hong Kong. For his contributions, Marden was appointed a Commander of the Order of the British Empire (CBE) in 1976.

He died at his home in Shek O in Hong Kong in March 1999, aged 80.

Business positions
Preceded by George Marden	Chairman of Wheelock Marden; 1959–1985	Succeeded by Sir Y. K. Pao
Preceded by D. K. Newbigging	Chairman of the Hong Kong General Chamber of Commerce; 1982–1984	Succeeded by Jack Tang
