= Wheelock Properties =

Hong Kong real estate developer

Wheelock Properties Limited

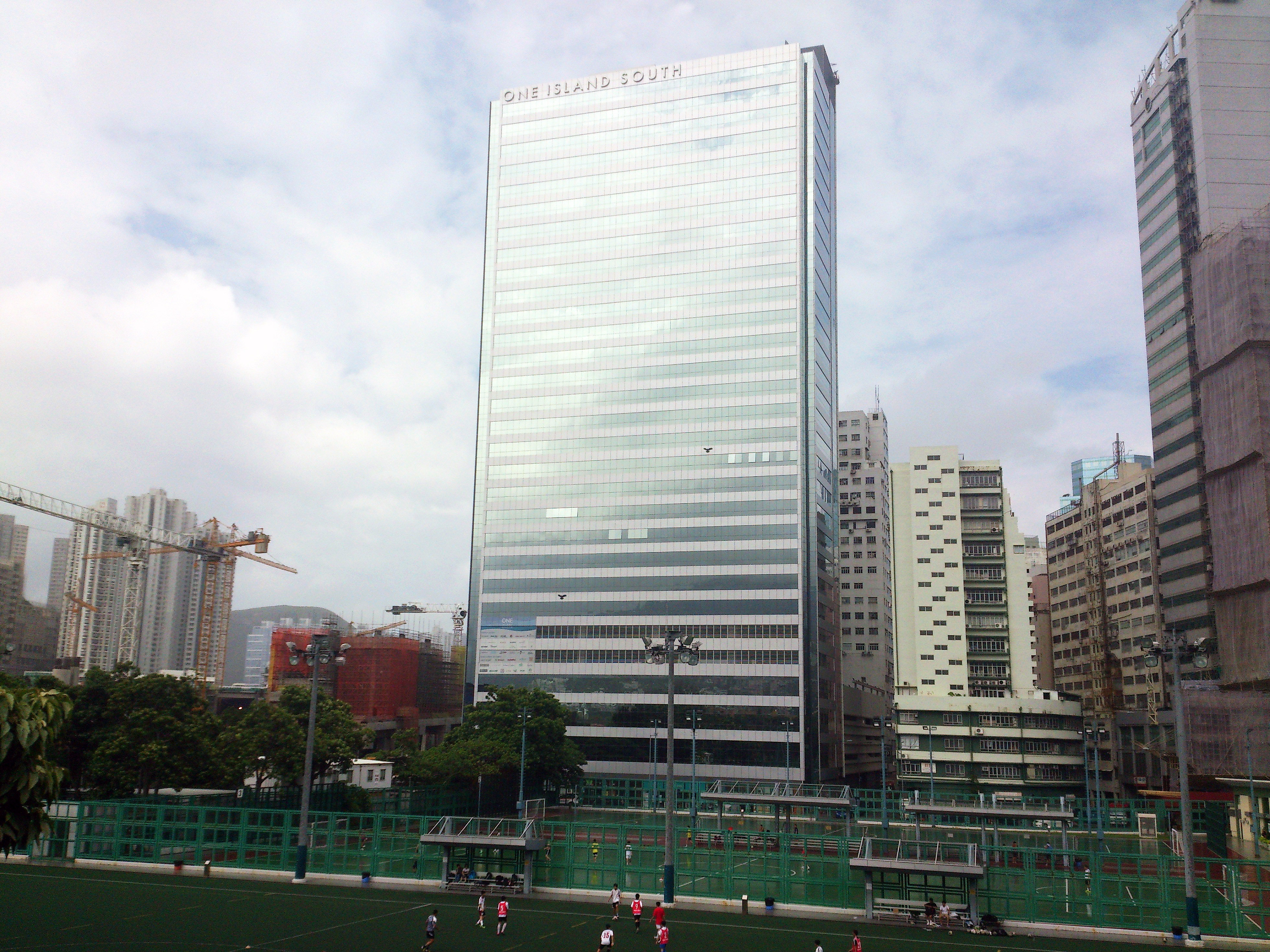
- Headquarters at One Island South
- Formerly: Hongkong Realty and Trust Co., Ltd.; New Asia Realty and Trust Co., Ltd.
- Company type: subsidiary
Traded as
SEHK:49	(former A share code)
SEHK:153	(former B share code)
- Industry: Real estate development
- Founded: 1923 (as Hongkong Realty and Trust)
- Successor: Wheelock Properties (Hong Kong) Limited
- Headquarters: Central, Hong Kong
- Area served: Hong Kong
- Key people: Douglas Woo (Managing Director)
- Owner: Wheelock and Co.
- Parent: Wheelock and Co.

Chinese name
- Traditional Chinese: 會德豐地產有限公司
Transcriptions

New Asia Realty and Trust Co., Ltd.
- Traditional Chinese: 新亞置業信託有限公司
Transcriptions

Hongkong Realty and Trust Co., Ltd.
- Traditional Chinese: 香港置業信託有限公司
Transcriptions
- Website: www.wheelockproperties.com.hk

Wheelock Properties Limited and Wheelock Properties (Hong Kong) Limited are subsidiaries of Wheelock and Co. Wheelock Properties is a real estate developer and a former listed company in the Hong Kong stock exchange.

== Business overview ==
Wheelock Properties engages in the property development and investment operations in Hong Kong. It participated in a number of private housing estates including Bellagio, Sorrento, Parc Oasis (via the subsidiary RDC) and Parc Palais and owns certain investment properties including Fitfort.

Before the privatization of Wheelock Properties, the company owned the 76% shares in Singapore-listed Wheelock Properties (Singapore). Both companies are privatized.

== History ==
The predecessor of the business unit, Hongkong Realty and Trust Co., Ltd., was incorporated on 17 March 1923. It was renamed to New Asia Realty and Trust Co., Ltd. in 1995. In the same year 新亞置業信託有限公司 was added as a registered Chinese name.

Hongkong Realty and Trust was a listed company since at least circa 1935. It was reported that circa 1948, Hongkong Realty is majority owned by Marden and Co. already, which the latter is the predecessor of the current Wheelock and Co. Marden-Wheelock was owned by Marden family until the 1980s., which it was takeover by Hong Kong ethnic Chinese business magnate Yue-Kong Pao, the maternal grandfather of the current (as of 2020) Wheelock Properties Managing Director, Douglas Woo.

As a listed subsidiary of the conglomerate Wheelock and Co., New Asia Realty takeover its own listed subsidiary Realty Development Corporation (RDC) in 2002. Both New Asia Realty and RDC also issued class B ordinary share until they were exchanged into class A ordinary shares in 2000.

The listed company was renamed from New Asia to Wheelock Properties Limited (Chinese: 會德豐地產有限公司) in 2004.

Wheelock Properties was privatized by its parent company Wheelock and Co. in 2010. At the time of privatization, Wheelock House in Hong Kong and Wheelock Place in Singapore are the main investment properties of the business unit.

After the privatisation, the business unit also do business via another legal person Wheelock Properties (Hong Kong) Limited. In 2016, sister company The Wharf (Holdings) (also majority-owned by Wheelock and Co.) bought a large portion of Wheelock House from the parent company Wheelock & Co. as well as from the chairman Peter Woo and his wife. However, soon after the floor area of Wheelock House was injected to another sister company Wharf Real Estate Investment Company.

The parent company of the business unit, Wheelock and Co., remained as a listed company until 2020.
