= The Garden Company Limited =

Hong Kong bakery

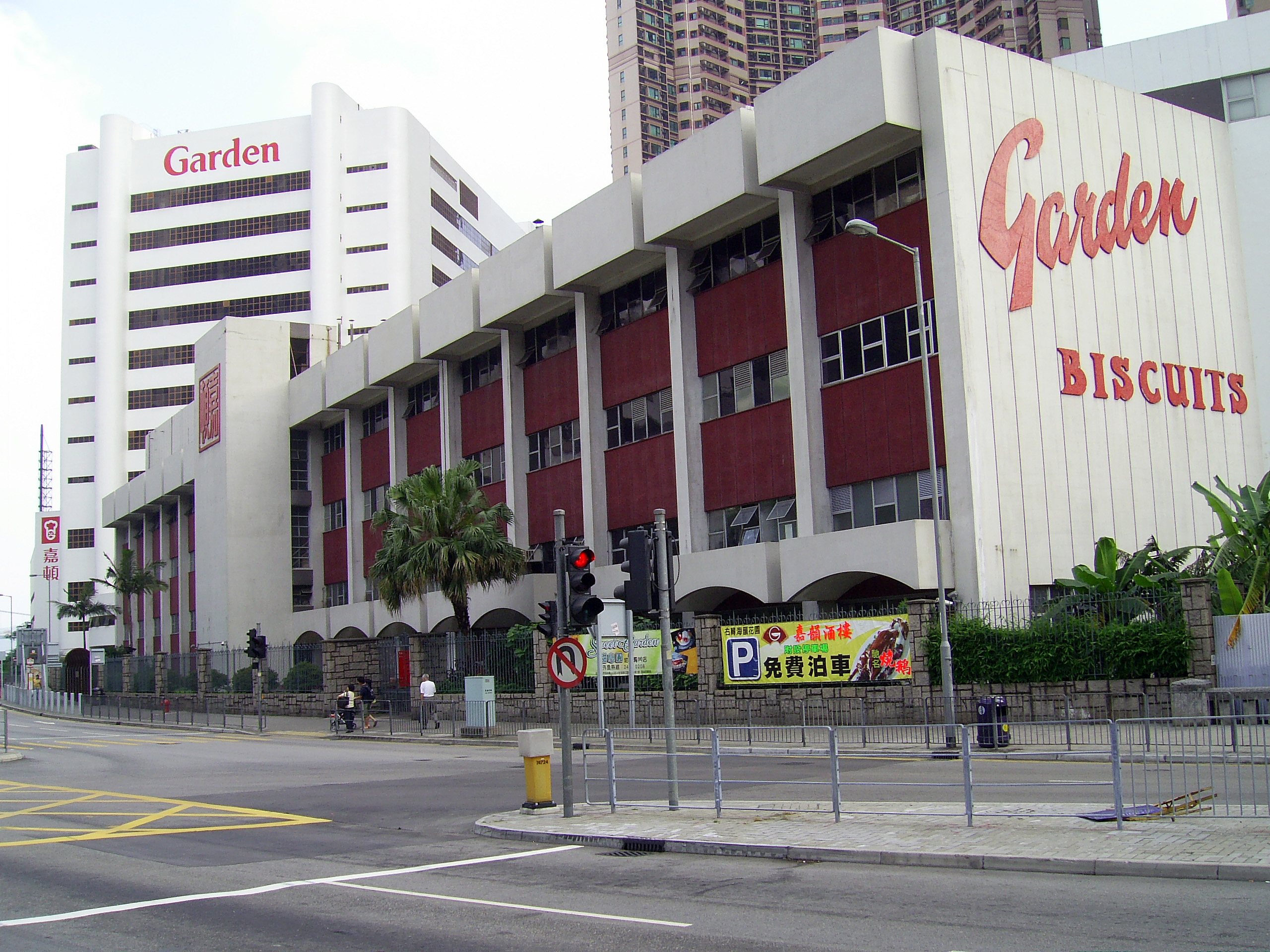
- Biscuits factory in Sham Tseng
- Native name: 嘉頓有限公司
- Industry: Baked goods and confectionery
- Founded: 26 November 1926; 99 years ago
- Founders: Tse Fong Cheung and Wah O. Wong
- Headquarters: Sham Shui Po, Hong Kong
- Owner: Cheung family
- Website: garden.com.hk

The Garden Company Limited
- Traditional Chinese: 嘉頓有限公司
- Simplified Chinese: 嘉顿有限公司
Transcriptions
Standard Mandarin
- Hanyu Pinyin: Jiā Dùn Yǒuxiàngōngsī
Yue: Cantonese
- Jyutping: gaa1 deon6 jau5 haan6 gung1 si1

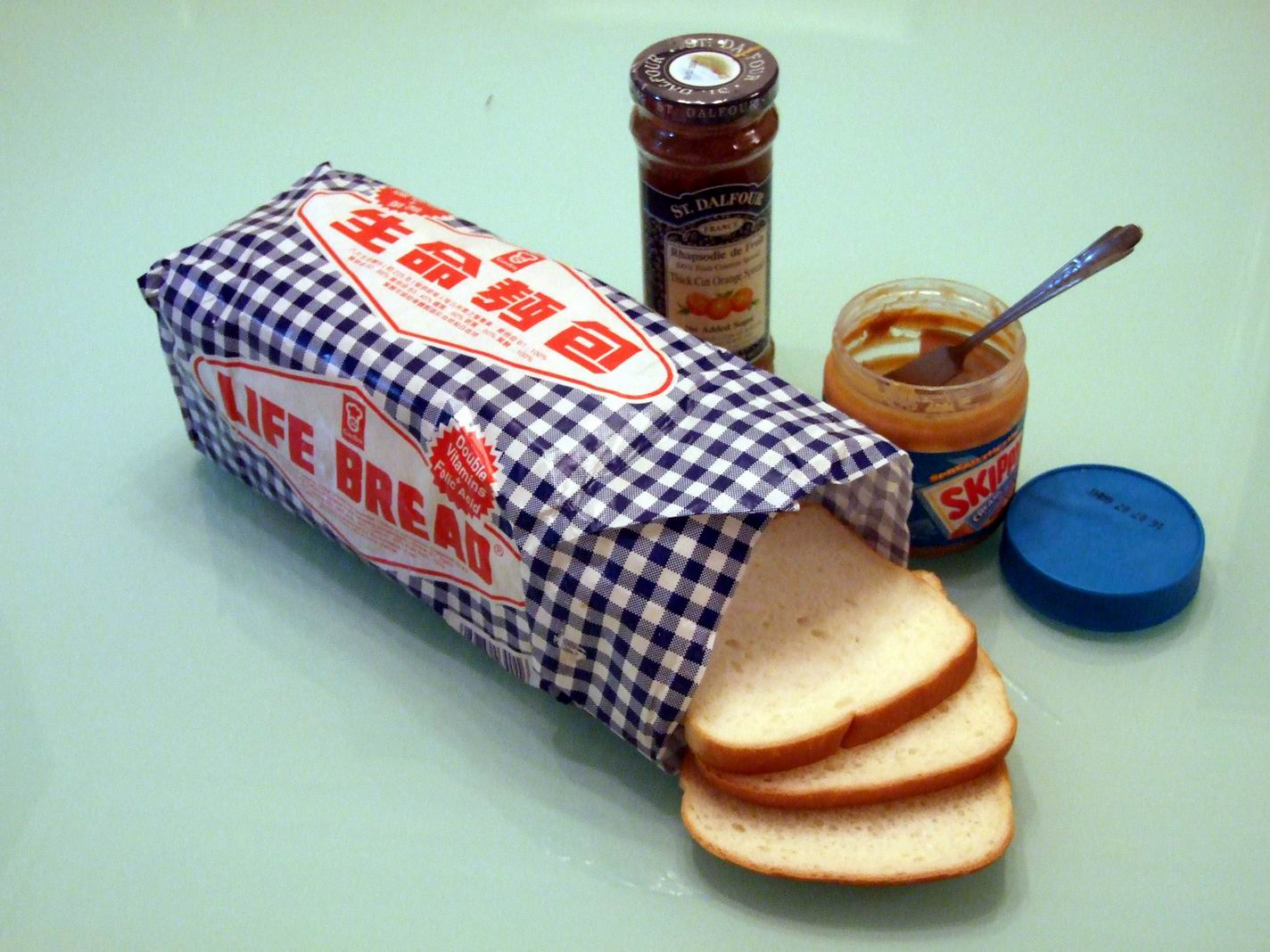
Life Bread, a product of the Garden Company.

The Garden Company Limited (Chinese: 嘉頓有限公司; Jyutping: gaa1 deon6 jau5 haan6 gung1 si1) is a Hong Kong–based bakery and confectionery manufacturer. The company was one of the first Chinese owned businesses created to sell modern-style food products in the territory. They also made bread and confectionery more affordable for lower-income earners.

== History ==
Founded in 1926 by cousins Tse Fong Cheung (Chinese: 張子芳) and Wah O. Wong (Chinese: 黃華岳) in Kowloon with a single bakery. The company's name is named after the Hong Kong Zoological and Botanical Gardens.

Garden is traditionally a Chinese company and supplied bread to the Chinese army during World War II. The firm closed operations during the Japanese occupation of Hong Kong from 1941 to 1945. The company expanded with the growth of Hong Kong before and after World War II and benefited from the influx of immigrants. In the 1956 Hong Kong riots Garden Bakery's Kowloon factory was destroyed and the colonial government awarded it HK$743,000 in compensation in 1957.

In the 1980s and 1990s, Garden products were shipped overseas to Chinese communities around the world.

Today, the company remains family (Cheung family) owned with several joint ventures with other Chinese firms. It is one of few Hong Kong firms with operations still in Hong Kong.

== Product lines ==
- bread
- snacks
- scones
- buns
- speciality breads
- egg rolls
- cakes and mixes
- army bread (1940s)

== Production facilities ==
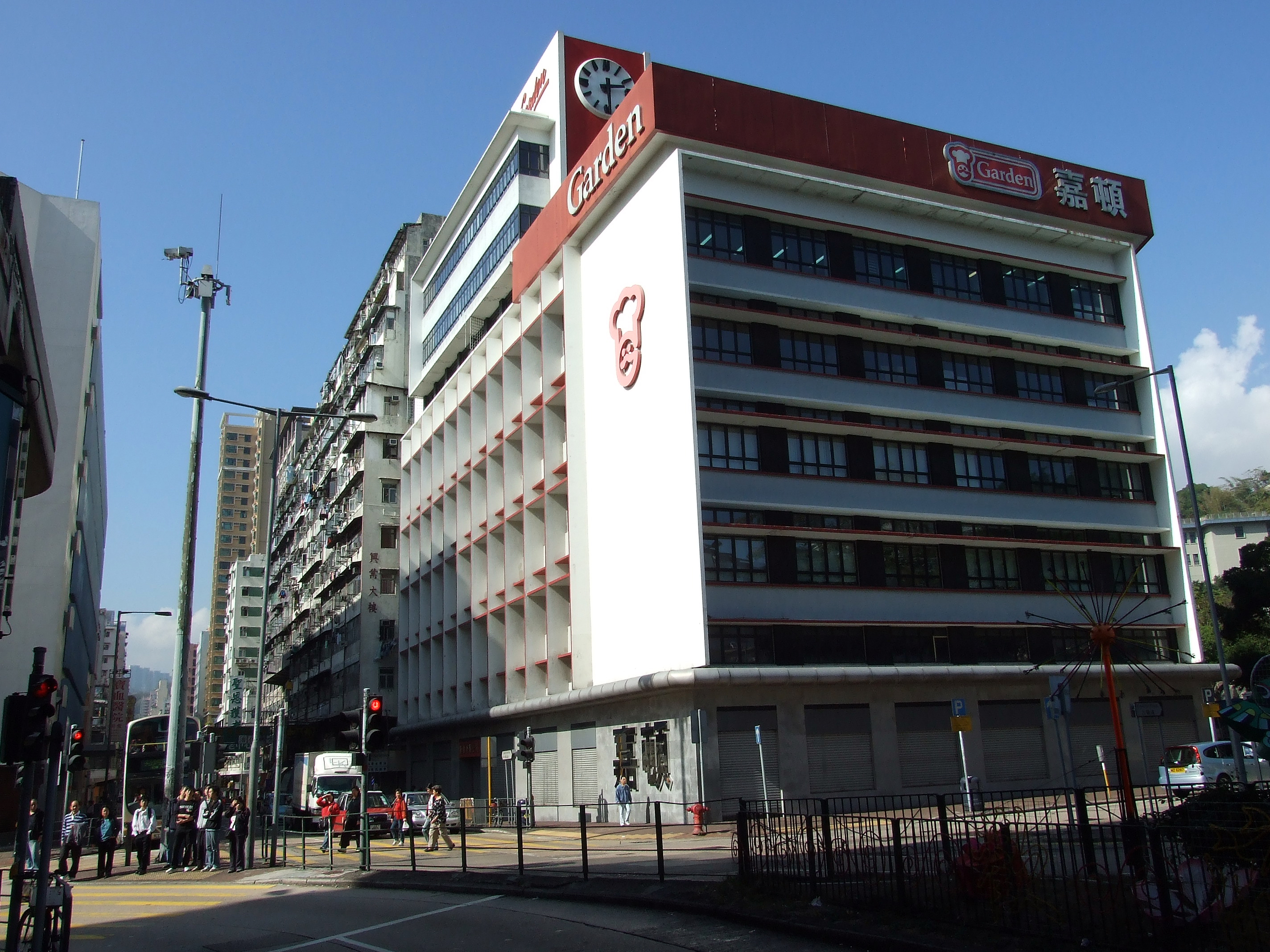
Bakery and head office in Sham Shui Po

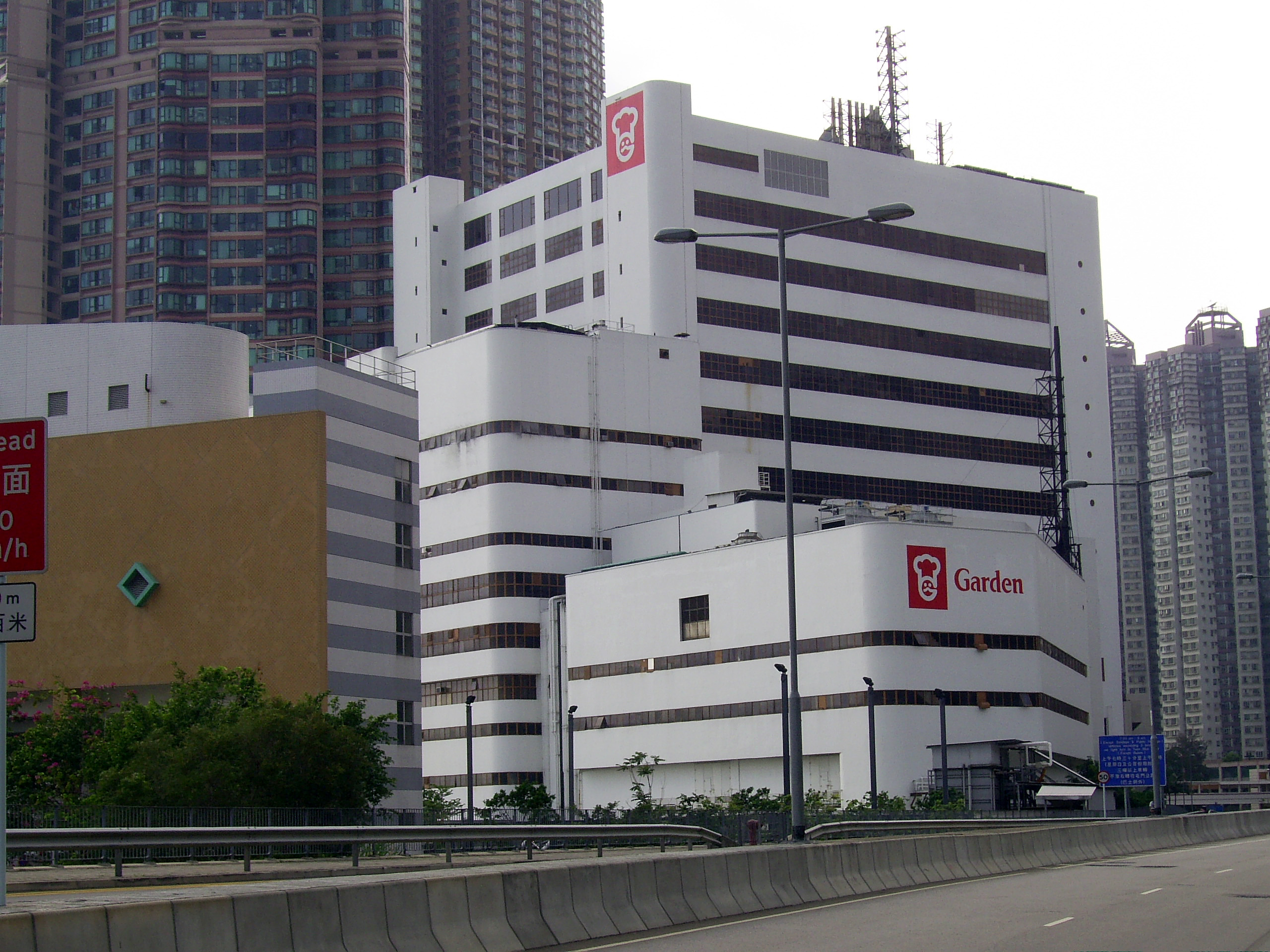
Sham Tseng factory

- Sham Tseng
  - 13,000 square metres (1962)
  - 2nd expansion (1974)
  - 3rd expansion (1982)
  - 4th expansion – 50,000 square metres (1992)
  - 5th expansion – 70,000-square metres (2000)
- Kowloon
  - 1st bakery (1926–1935)
  - expansion – 475-square metres (1935–1938)
  - expansion – 1,400-square metres (1938–1941)
  - expansion (1947–1951)
  - expansion – 7,000 square metres (1951–1958)
  - expansion – 10,000 square metres (1958-?)
- Central
  - 2nd bakery (1927–1935)
- Sham Shui Po (1931–1934)
- Hua Jia Foodstuff Company, Dongguan, China (1985)
- Gong Yang Foodstuff Company, Jiangsu, China (2000)

== See also ==
- List of food companies
- San Miguel Brewery Hong Kong
- Vitasoy
- Manufacturing in Hong Kong
