= Sham Tseng =

Town in Hong Kong

Coordinates: 22°21′55″N 114°3′26″E

- Chinese: 深井
- Literal meaning: Deep well
Transcriptions
Standard Mandarin
- Hanyu Pinyin: Shēn Jǐng
Yue: Cantonese
- Yale Romanization: Sām jéng
- Jyutping: Sam1 zeng2

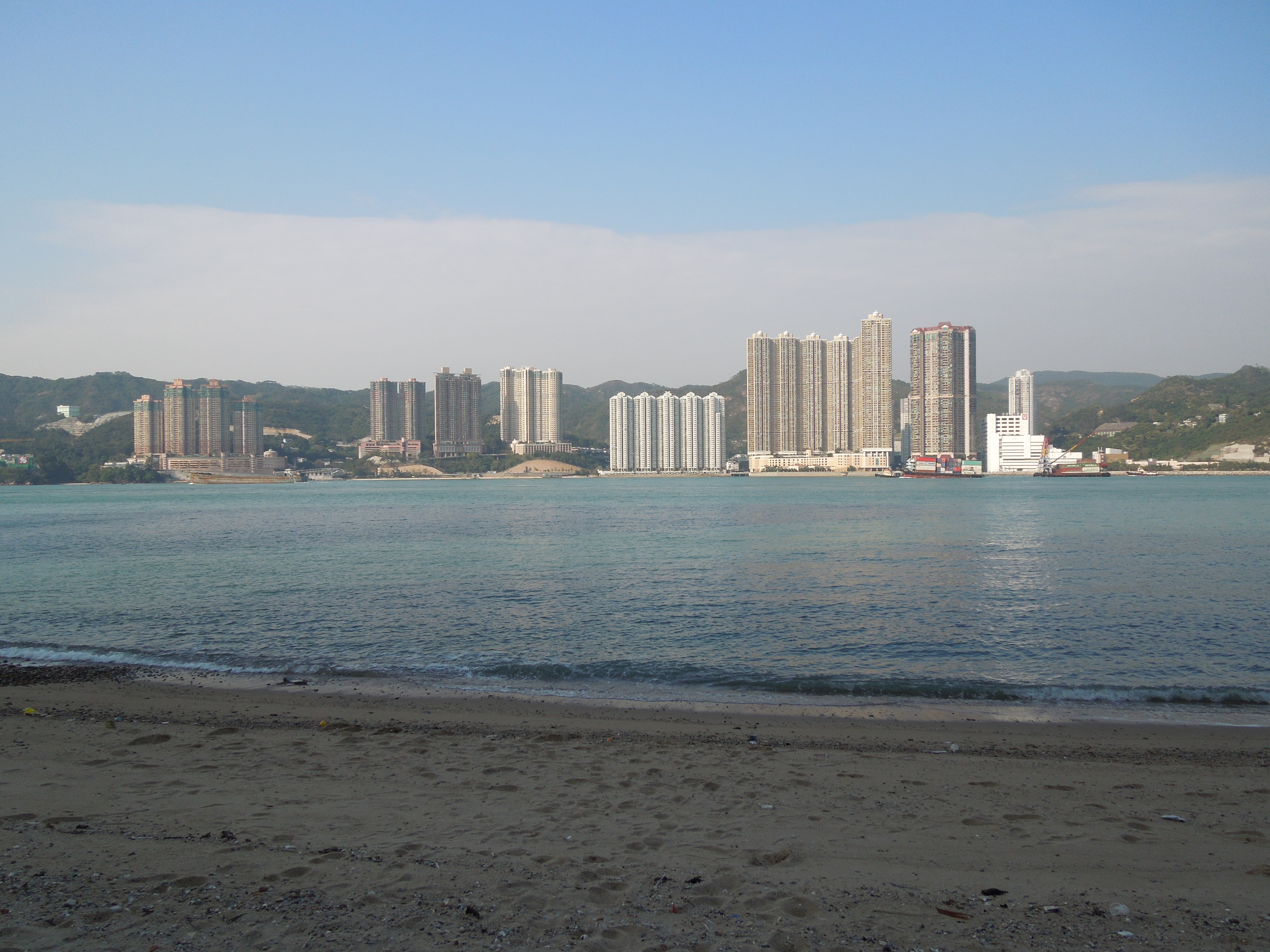
Sham Tseng skyline. From left to right: Lido Garden, Bellagio, Ocean Pointe, Garden Bakery factory. Viewed from Pak Wan Beach in Ma Wan.

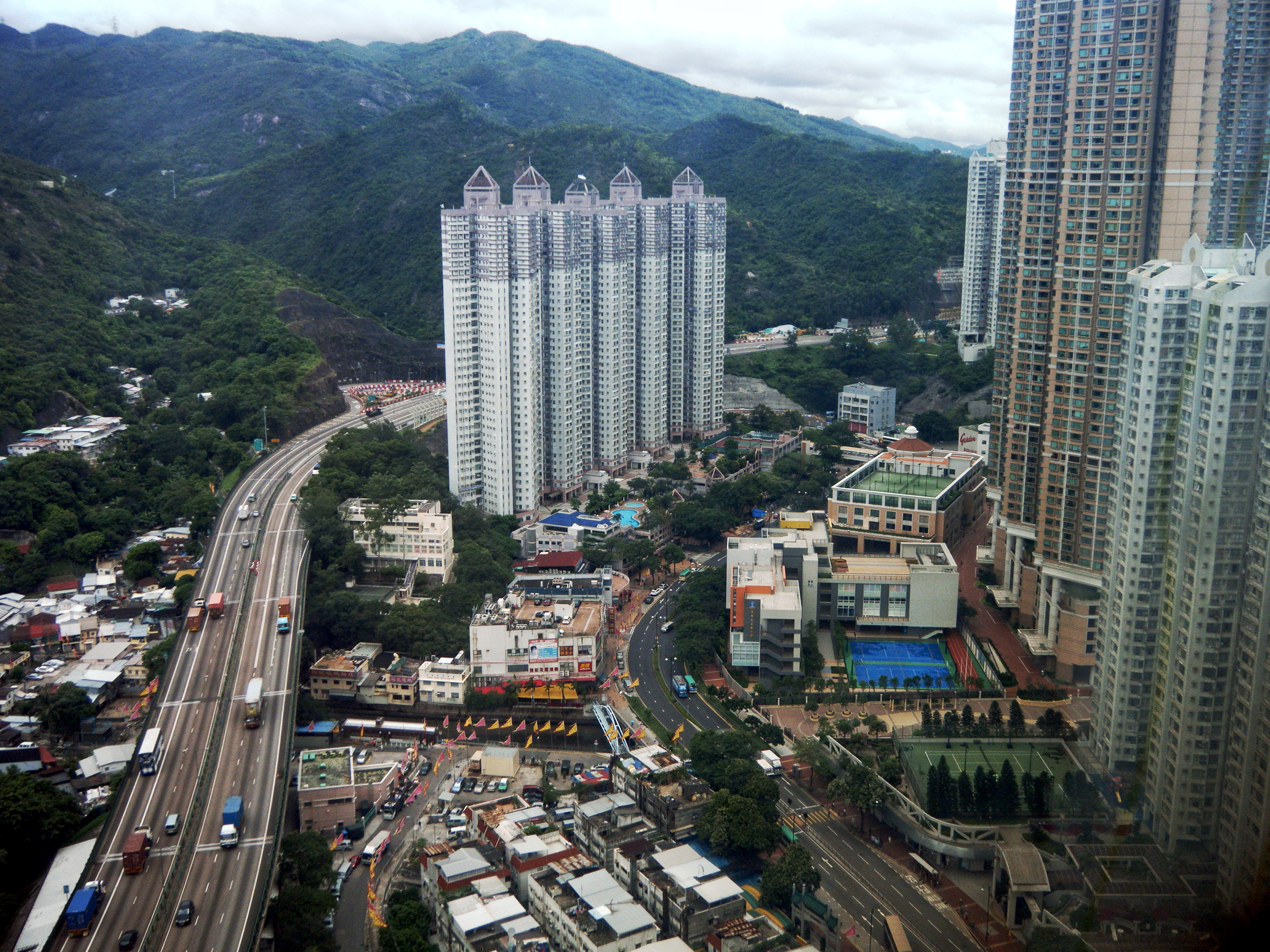
Castle Peak Road in Sham Tseng

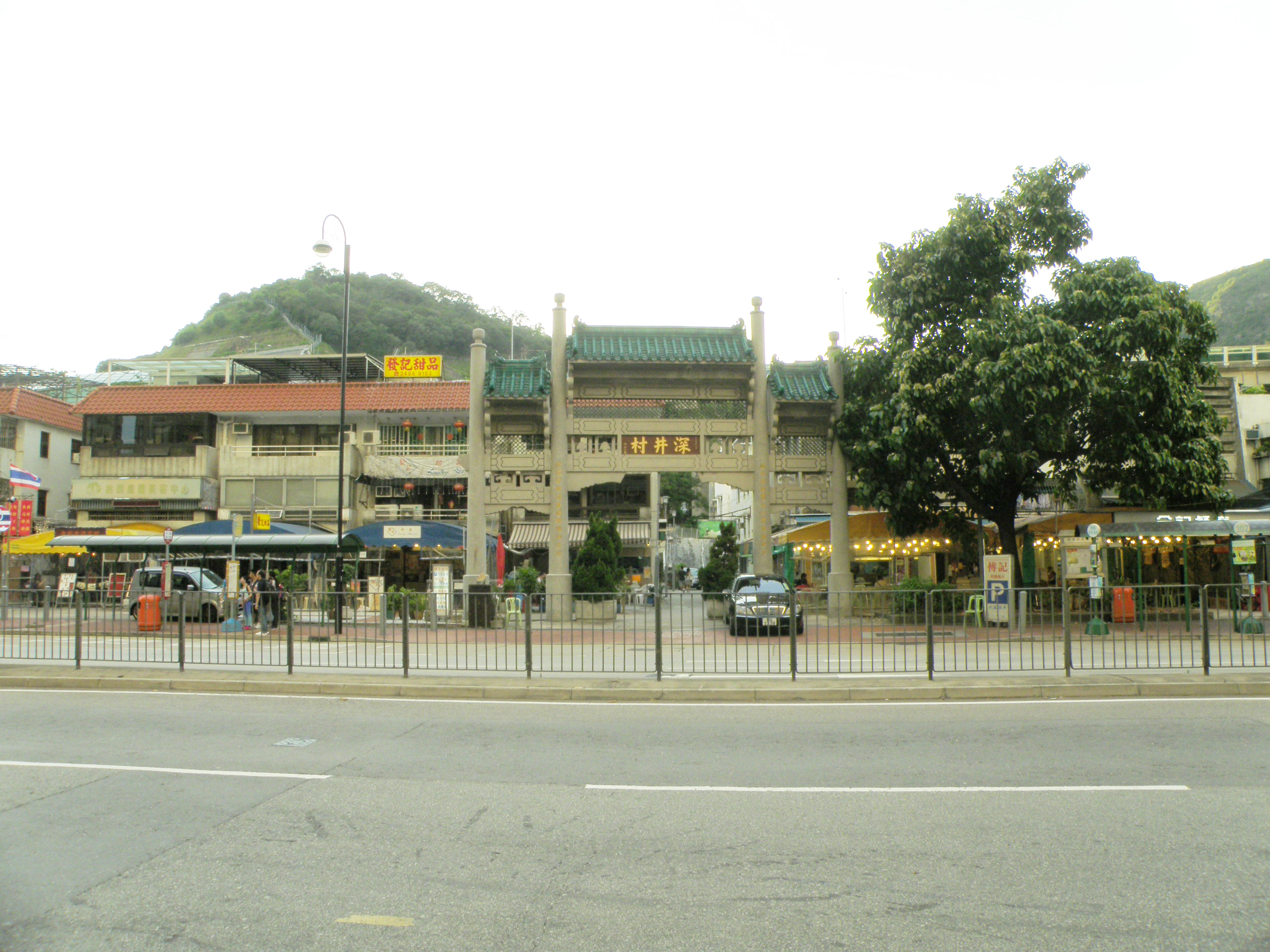
Sham Tseng Village (深井村) viewed from Castle Peak Road - Sham Tseng.)

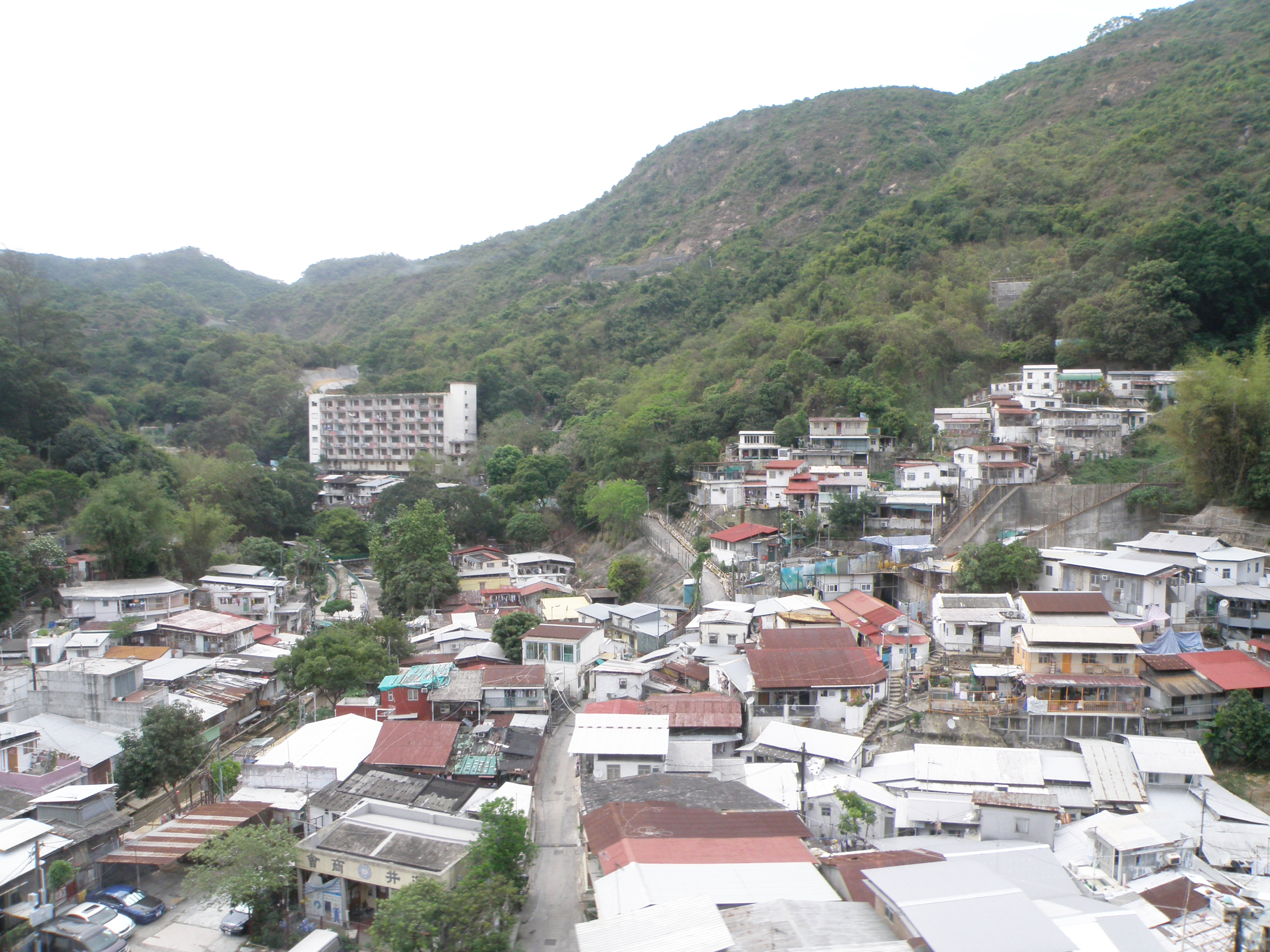
Sham Tseng Village (深井村)

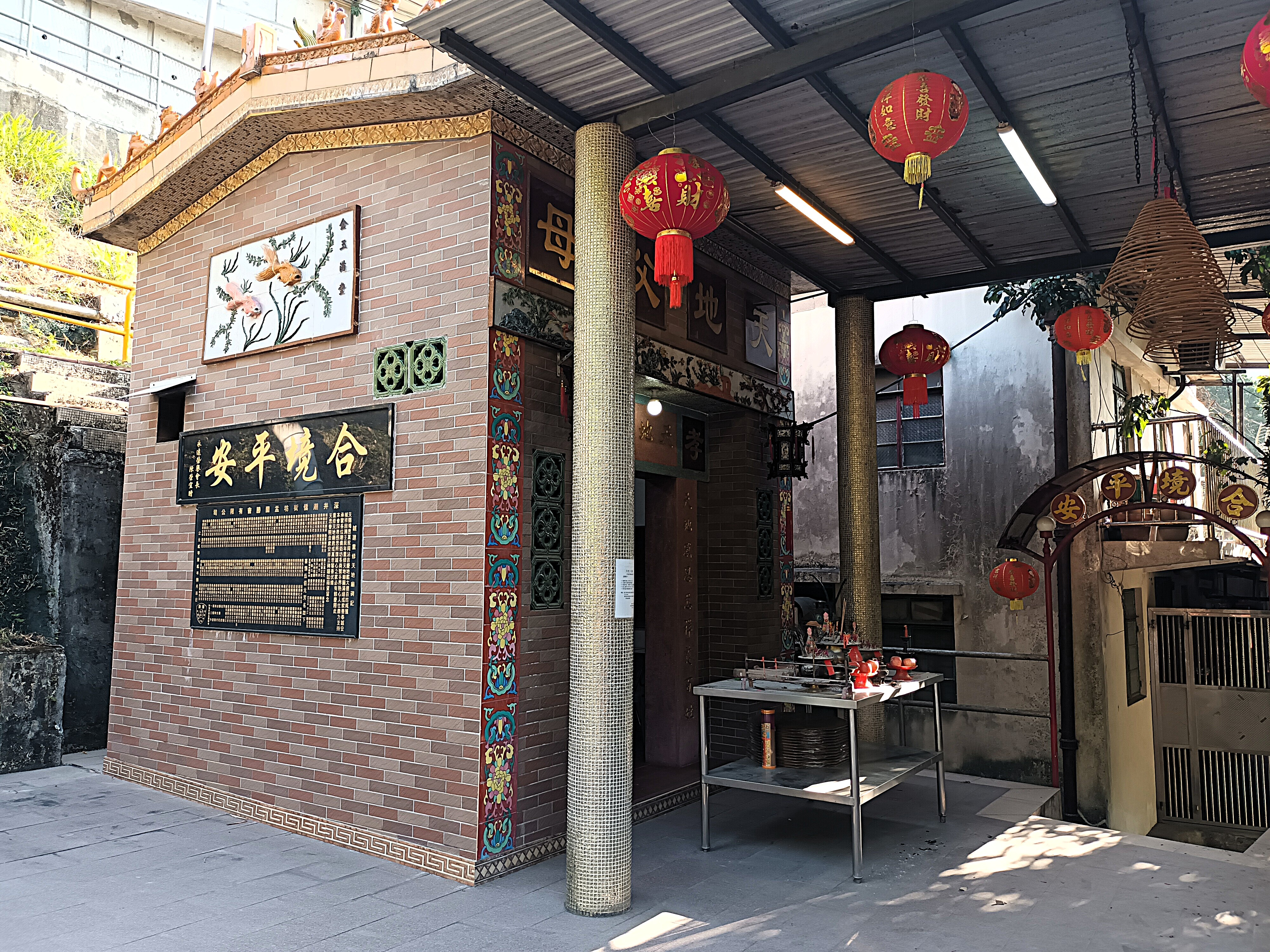
Tin Di Fu Mo Temple (天地父母廟; 'Temple of the Gods of Heaven and Earth'), in the upper part of Sham Tseng Village. A first temple was established at this location in 1946 by the Chiu Chow people of Sham Tseng.

Sham Tseng (Chinese: 深井) is a coastal area in Tsuen Wan District, Hong Kong, between Ting Kau and Tsing Lung Tau.

== History ==
At the time of the 1911 census, the population of Sham Tseng was 72. The number of males was 32.

In 1982, the Government launched a new town project for the area. There were proposals for a massive housing scheme, where the population of the village, then estimated at 6,000, was set to increase dramatically to 50,000 people. There would be an additional 26,000 in public housing, Home Ownership Scheme flats, Government offices and other amenities constructed on 47 hectares of land.

Starting in the 1990s, more and more private housing estates were built in the area for its views of Tsing Ma Bridge over Ma Wan Channel. It is linked to many other parts of Hong Kong by buses and mini-buses.

== Villages and housing estates ==
Sham Tseng's villages are overshadowed and towered by new private housing estates:

Villages

- Sham Tseng Village (深井村)
- Sham Tseng East Village (深井東村)
- Sham Tseng Kau Tsuen (深井舊村)
- Sham Tseng San Tsuen (深井新村)
- Sham Tseng West Village (深井西村)

Sham Tseng Resite Village is a recognized village under the New Territories Small House Policy.

Private housing estates

- Bellagio – built on the site of former San Miguel brewery
- Dragonette
- Golden Villa
- Lido Garden
- Ocean Pointe – built on the site of former Union Carbide depot
- Pink Villa
- Rhine Garden
- Rhine Terrace
- Sea Crest Villa
- Anglers Bay

Sham Tseng is also home to the Sham Tseng Light Housing project, a 45-unit temporary social housing project housed in a former textile factory building.

== Education ==
There are three schools in Sham Tseng:

- Emmanuel Primary School
- Sham Tseng Catholic Primary School – formerly Chai Wan Kok Catholic Primary School is relocated from Tsuen Wan for 2009–2010 school year
- Parkview-Rhine Garden Pre-school

Sham Tseng is in Primary One Admission (POA) School Net 62, which includes schools in Tsuen Wan and areas nearby. The net includes multiple aided schools and one government school, Hoi Pa Street Government Primary School.

== Commerce ==
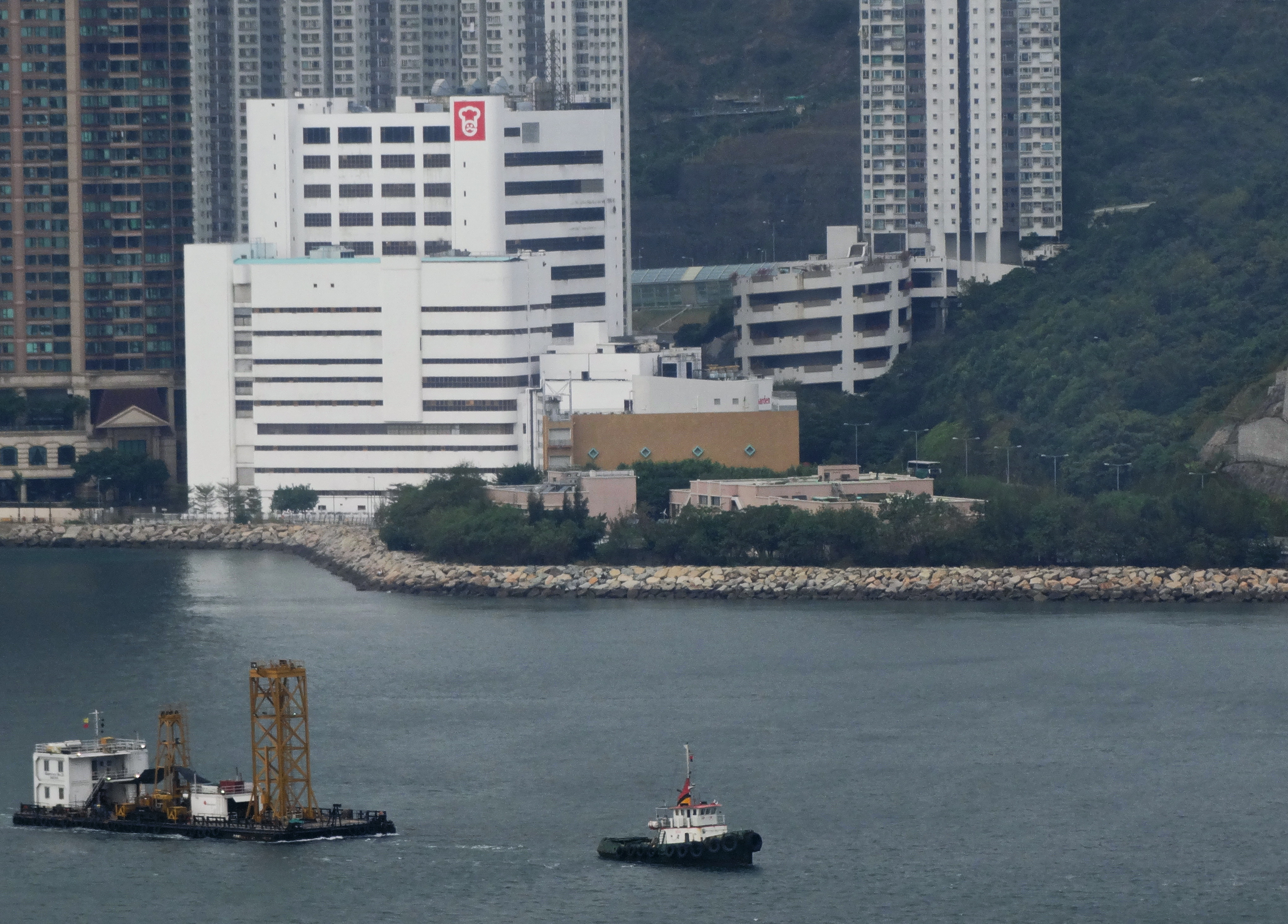
Factory of The Garden Company in Sham Tseng

Sham Tseng is home to baker Garden Company Limited and former home of San Miguel Brewery Hong Kong. The brewery operations began in the 1933 as Hong Kong Brewers and Distillers Ltd under JH Ruttonjee and was sold to San Miguel Corporation in 1948. The brewery operations and head office moved in 1996 to Yuen Long Industrial Estate. A private housing estate called Bellagio now occupies the site of the old brewery.

Union Carbide once had a storage depot in the area, but it has since moved.

Small family restaurants make the bulk of the employment in the area. Most area residents work outside of Sham Tseng.

== Tourist attractions ==
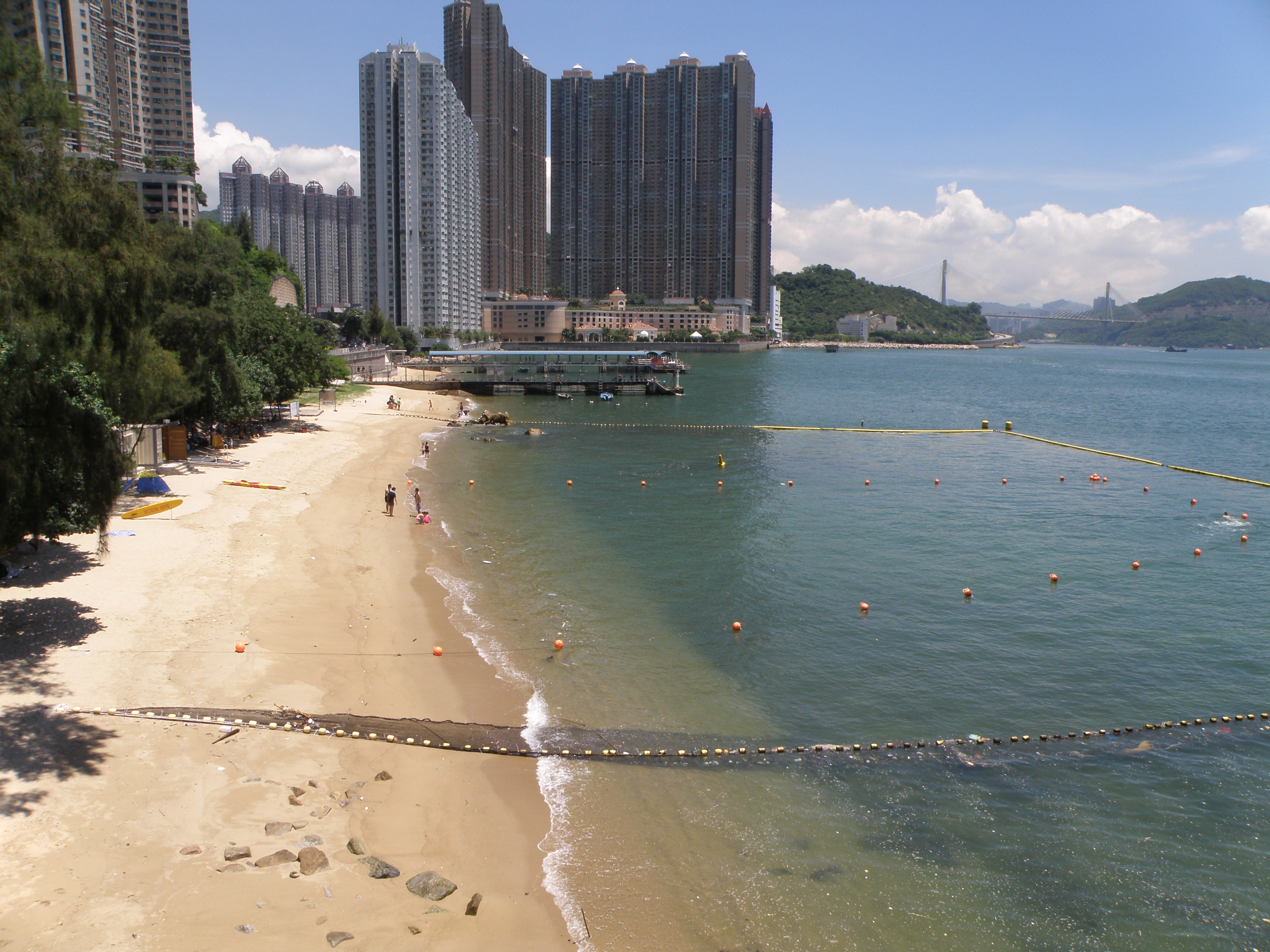
Anglers' Beach

To the north of Sham Tseng is an undeveloped hilly area. Tai Lam Country Park, a large park located northwest of Sham Tseng. There are nature trails along Butterfly River and Falls near Sham Tseng.

Numerous beaches are found at or near Sham Tseng from the waterways joining Ma Wan Channel and Rambler Channel, but most are so polluted and officially closed from swimming due to contamination from sewers and the Sham Tseng Nullah. As a consequence, residents are more inclined to swim in pools located at their residential complexes.

A list of beaches in Sham Tseng:

- Approach Beach (近水灣泳灘)
- Anglers' Beach (釣魚灣泳灘)
- Casam Beach (更生灣泳灘), in Ting Kau
- Dragon Bay (青龍灣), in Tsing Lung Tau. Privately owned
- Gemini Beaches (雙仙灣泳灘)
- Hoi Mei Wan Beach (海美灣泳灘)
- Lido Beach (麗都灣泳灘), in Ting Kau
- Ting Kau Beach (汀九灣泳灘), in Ting Kau

Sham Tseng Temporary Market is a local produce market under the Sham Tseng Bridge flyover.

There are two retail malls located below residential flats to meet local needs:

- Rhine Garden Shopping Centre
- Bellagio Mall

== Food ==
Sham Tseng is famous for roasted goose

== Infrastructure ==
- Sham Tseng Treatment Works
- Sham Tseng Sewage Treatment Works
- Sham Tseng Substation – China Light and Power
- Sham Tseng Fire and Ambulance Depots – Hong Kong Fire Services
- Airport Core Programme Exhibition Centre – Hong Kong International Airport
- Ma Wan Marine Traffic Control Centre – Transport Department

== Transport ==
- Kowloon Motor Bus, Long Win Bus and Citybus (Hong Kong) operates bus routes that stop in Sham Tseng:
  - KMB 48P / 234A / 234B / 234C / 234D / 261B / 53 / 52X
  - Citybus 952 / 952C / N952
  - LWB A38
- Minibuses that stops in Sham Tseng:
  - 96/96M/302/308M
- Taxis (red taxis serving Kowloon and Hong Kong Island and green taxis serving the New Territories)
- Sham Tseng Link – a proposed bridge and highway linking Sham Tseng and Lantau Island; with connections with Route 3
- Sham Tseng Ferry Pier (深井碼頭) – former ferry service to Ma Wan Town

Major roads in Sham Tseng include:

- Castle Peak Road
- Tuen Mun Road/Tsing Long Highway
