= Western Harbour Crossing =

Tunnel crossing Victoria Harbour, Hong Kong

Western Harbour Crossing 西區海底隧道
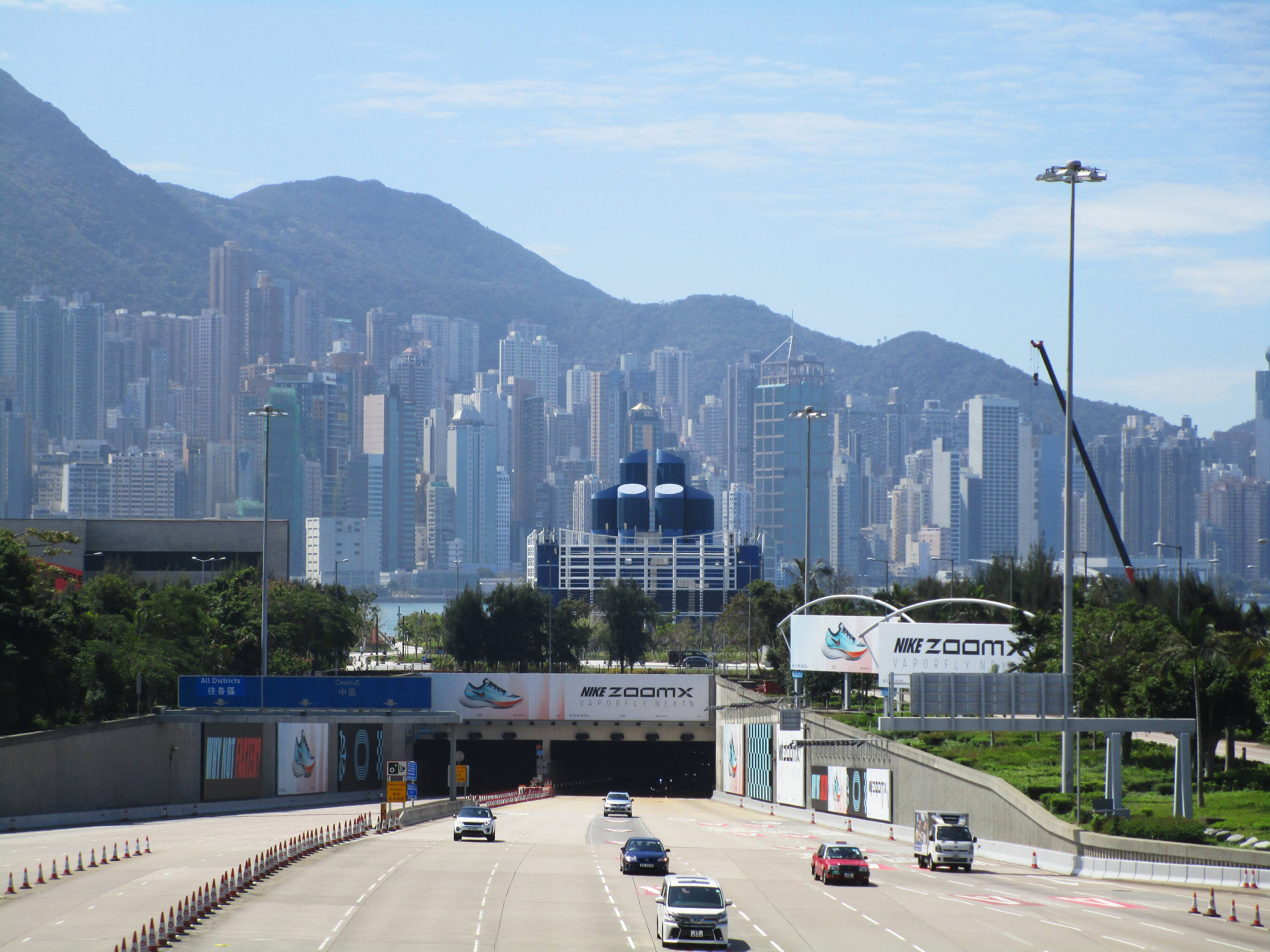
- Western Harbour Crossing tunnel entrance and exit at West Kowloon side.
- Interactive map of Western Harbour Crossing 西區海底隧道

Overview
- Coordinates: 22°18′5″N 114°9′24″E
- Status: Active
- Route: Part of Route 3
- Start: West Kowloon
- End: Sai Ying Pun

Operation
- Constructed: August 1993 to April 1997
- Opened: 30 April 1997; 29 years ago
- Owner: Hong Kong Government
- Operator: Pacific Infrastructure Limited
- Traffic: Vehicular
- Character: immersed tube
- Toll: Yes
- Vehicles per day: ~180,000

Technical
- Length: 1,975 metres (6,480 ft)
- No. of lanes: 6 lanes (3 lanes per direction) in road tunnel with 4 lanes per direction on exit
- Operating speed: 80 kilometres per hour (50 mph)

Western Harbour Crossing
- Traditional Chinese: 西區海底隧道
- Simplified Chinese: 西区海底隧道
Transcriptions
Standard Mandarin
- Hanyu Pinyin: Xīqū Hǎidǐ Suìdào
Yue: Cantonese
- Yale Romanization: Sāikēui Hóidái Seuihdouh
- Jyutping: sai1 keoi1 hoi2 dai2 seoi6 dou6

The Western Harbour Crossing (WHC) is a dual three-lane immersed tube tunnel in Hong Kong. It is the third road tunnel to cross Victoria Harbour, linking reclaimed land in Yau Ma Tei in West Kowloon with Sai Ying Pun on Hong Kong Island. It was constructed by the Western Harbour Tunnel Company Limited (WHTCL), which also operated the tunnel from 1993 to 2023 under a build-operate-transfer (BOT) model on a 30-year franchise contract with the Hong Kong government.

The tunnel was the first three-lane road tunnel in Asia to be constructed using submerged pipe. It was built as part of the Airport Core Programme, which included other infrastructure projects to support the Hong Kong International Airport at Chek Lap Kok. The tunnel carries on the Route 3 designation from the West Kowloon Highway and connects to Route 4 on Hong Kong Island.

== History ==
=== Background ===
By the early 1980s, commuters made 120,000 trips at the Cross-Harbour Tunnel (CHT) every day, beyond its designed capacity of 80,000 daily trips. Population growth was also projected to reach 6.34 million in 2001 from 5.125 million in 1981. The Hong Kong government launched the Second Comprehensive Transport Study in the late 1980s, which said cross-harbour trips would increase greatly – person-trips would increase by 86% from 1.4m to 2.6m, and goods-vehicle-trips by 129% from 34,000 to 78,000 by 2001.

Also, with the development of the Hong Kong International Airport, it was to be an important component of the strategic Airport Core Programme linking it to the Kwai Tsing Container Terminals and Hong Kong Island. There are 10 km of associated roads (40 km of lanes) and 17 bridges.

The Government announced in 1990 that the tunnel project would be financed as a private venture, with bidding initially scheduled to be called in April 1991. As the project was to span the change in sovereignty of Hong Kong, the support of both the British and Chinese was necessary. In September 1991, the British and Chinese governments signed the Memorandum of Understanding committing their firm support for building the new airport at Chek Lap Kok and its connecting infrastructure. Since mid-1991, private sector companies interested in the project started looking for partners to form consortia. The formal tendering exercise was launched in March 1992 and ended in early July 1992.

In early 1992, two consortia appeared to be vying for the contract. However, one week before the closing date for tenders, Cross Harbour Tunnel Company and CITIC decided to merge their bids. Cross Harbour Tunnel Company, with Wharf Holdings as its major shareholder, dissolved its own consortium in favour of joining with CITIC group; the contractors of the CHT team were dropped. At the close of the tender, the Government was disappointed that there was only one bidder. Upon this news, two new consortia of construction companies proposed to build the project for the Government if the Government decided to pull the tender and run the project itself.

In 1993, the Western Harbour Crossing Ordinance (Cap. 436) was enacted to govern the construction and operation of tunnel. Having decided to rely on the private sector, the government opted for a build–operate–transfer (BOT) model, for 30 years. Tenders for the project were invited, and was won by the Western Harbour Tunnel Company (WHTCL). The franchise was awarded for 30 years, ending August 2023. The Western Harbour Crossing Bill was also passed to award the franchise to the Western Harbour Tunnel Company to build and operate WHC.

WHTCL's largest shareholder is The Cross-Harbour (Holdings) Limited (CHHL), which has a 50% stake. Its other shareholders are CITIC Limited and Kerry Properties Limited, which hold 35% and 15% effective interests in WHTCL respectively through a joint venture company.

On 5 June 2019, an Australian-based fund manager, Lanyon Asset Management Pty Limited, made a cash offer to acquire the 50% interest in the WHTCL from CHHL. Lanyon cited this was in the best interest of CHHL shareholders. CHHL rejected this offer on 11 June 2019.

=== Construction ===
The project team consisted of John Mundy (project manager), John Porter of Nishimatsu (project director), Kazutoshi Torakai of Kumagai Gumi (technical director), K.C. Tsui (JV construction manager for the mechanical and electrical works), Sandy Hone (JV deputy project manager and construction manager for the civil works), Knud Poulsen (engineering manager), Alex Peling (commercial manager), Robert Lloyd, Eric Granville and Don Ramanaynke (the Government's Highways Department Western Harbour Link Office engineers). The project cost was HK$7.5bn, funded privately. The project was completed in 1997.

The pipe itself is 2 km long.

== Toll and congestion ==
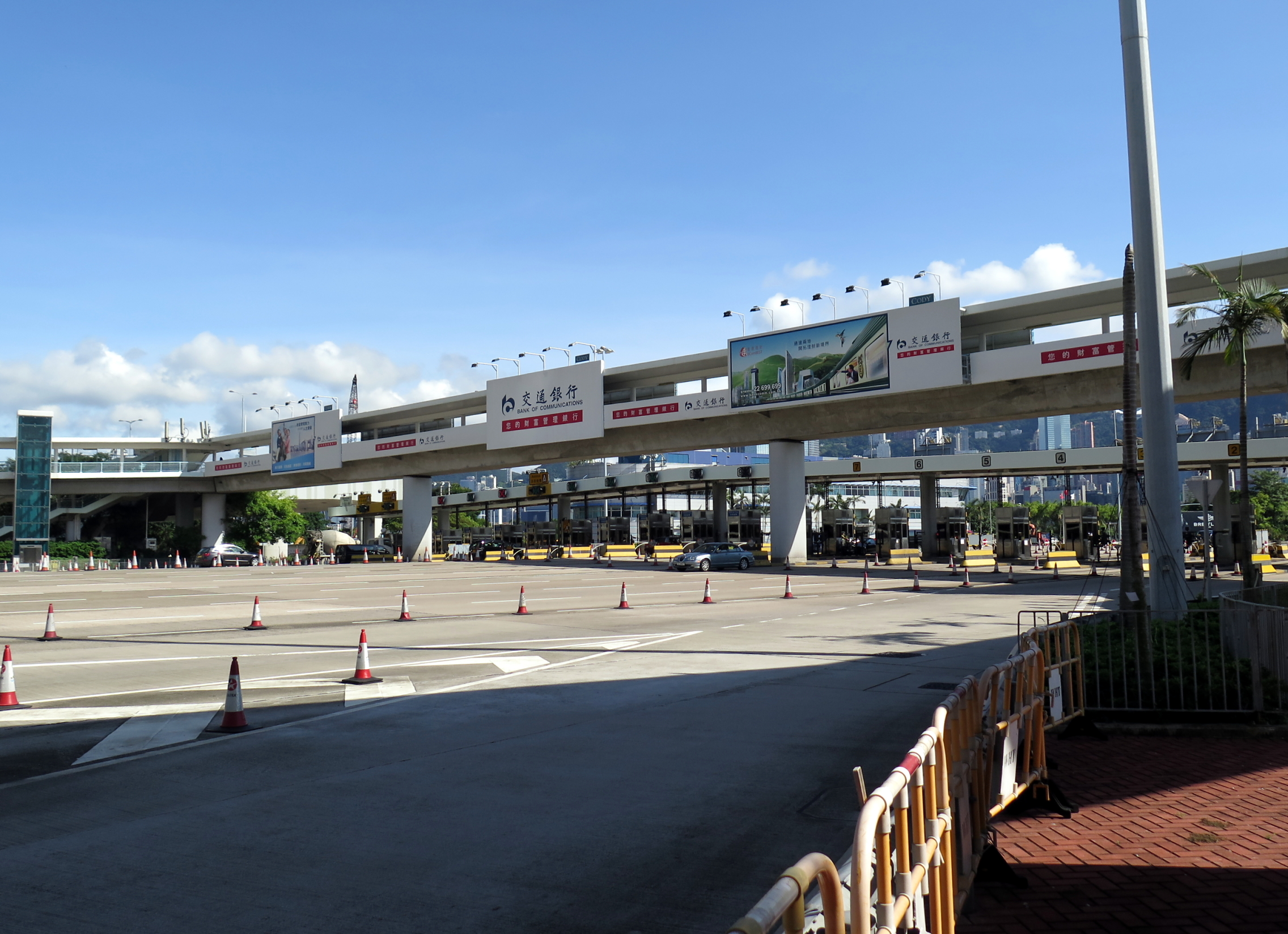
Western Harbour Crossing toll plaza

The initial toll for private cars projected by the consortium was $30. The franchisee traffic forecast in January 1997 made before the tunnel opened was between 50,000 and 70,000 vehicle trips daily during the first year of operation. The actual number of daily trips did not exceed 47,000 and averaged at 20,000.

=== Toll adjustment mechanism ===
The Government and the consortium agreed on the toll and its future adjustment where the starting toll for private cars was proposed to be at HK$30. The agreed automatic adjustment mechanism would allow the franchisee to maintain the target rate of return of between 15% and 18.5%. The operator could also increase the tunnel toll by HK$10 whenever its IRR fell below 15%.

Legislators, principally from the pan-democrat camp but including the Liberal Party, criticised the mechanism as being too generous in favour of the franchisee and were unwilling to approve the deal. The government feared that revision at LegCo would adversely impact project viability and force re-opening of negotiations with the consortium. Underlying that were fears the consortium and its banks may withdraw from the project, so wanted the bill voted through as a package.

One week before the final LegCo vote on the deal, in response to legislators' fears, the Liberal Party proposed an amendment that both the Government and the consortium found to be an acceptable compromise: to preserve the HK$30 opening toll, but the return on investment would be capped at 16.5% (instead of 18.5%) for the first three years after the tunnel opened; amounts above that would be transferred the toll stability fund to reduce the need for future toll rises. On 21 July 1993, the legislative council approved by 35 to 19 the amendment proposed by the Liberal Party.

Any changes in tolls must be gazetted. The toll adjustment mechanism allows the franchisee to apply for an increase its tolls on six specified dates during the franchise period depending on revenues achieved. Toll increases and revenue appropriation according to following scenarii were envisaged:

1. if the actual net revenue generated falls below the upper net revenue projection, the operator may apply for an increase in tolls;
2. if the net revenue exceeds the upper estimated net revenue but is less than the maximum estimated net revenue, the company would be entitled to the upper estimated net revenue plus half of the excess and the balance, and the remaining half of the excess is transferred to a 'toll stability fund';
3. if the actual net revenue is greater than the maximum estimated net revenue, the company is entitled to the upper estimated net revenue plus half of the excess between upper estimated net revenue and maximum estimated net revenue; the surplus is transferred to the Toll Stability Fund;
4. If traffic levels and revenue fall below projections, the operator is permitted to bring forward the date of a toll increase according to the mechanism rules. However, the right to increase tolls will be deferred if the revenue received is above the forecast, and a rate of return is over the range specified.

=== Change of tolls over time (when operated by Western Harbour Tunnel Company) ===
	starting date	1997	2000	2003	2004	2008	2010	2013	2015	2017	2018	2019
Category	Vehicle type	30 Apr	3 Dec	16 Feb	4 Jul	6 Jan	1 Aug	1 Jan	22 Feb	1 Jan	27 May	1 June
1	Motorcycles, motor tricycles	$15	$20	$20	$22	$22	$23	$25	$25	$25	$25	$25
2	Private cars	$30	$35	$37	$40	$45	$50	$55	$60	$65	$70	$75
3	Taxis	$30	$35	$35	$35	$40	$45	$50	$55	$60	$65	$70
4	Public and private light buses	$40	$45	$47	$50	$55	$60	$65	$70	$75	$80	$85
5*	Light goods vehicles	$45	$50	$50	$55	$55	$60	$65	$70	$75	$80	$85
6*	Medium goods vehicles	$65	$70	$70	$80	$80	$85	$90	$95	$100	$105	$110
7*	Heavy goods vehicles	$95	$100	$100	$110	$110	$115	$120	$125	$130	$135	$140
8	Public and private single-decked buses	$40	$50	$60	$70	$80	$90	$100	$110	$120	$130	$140
9	Public and private double-decked buses	$55	$70	$85	$100	$115	$128	$140	$155	$170	$185	$200
*Each additional axle in excess of 2: $30 source:historic WHC published data

=== Change of tolls over time (when operated by Hong Kong Government) ===
Category	Vehicle type		2023 2 Aug -
1	Motorcycles, motor tricycles		$25
2	Taxis		$25
3	Private cars		$60
4	Public and private light buses		$85
5	Light goods vehicles		$85
6	Medium goods vehicles		$110
7	Heavy goods vehicles		$140
8	Public and private single-decked buses	Non-franchised	$140
8	Public and private single-decked buses	Franchised	Free
9	Public and private double-decked buses	Non-franchised	$200
9	Public and private double-decked buses	Franchised	Free

=== Congestion ===
	total volume	av. daily	share
year	(million trips)	(thousand trips)	(%)
1997	5.50	22.35	9.78
1998	12.08	33.10	14.77
1999	14.31	39.21	17.37
2000	15.66	42.80	18.18
2001	14.49	39.70	16.91
2002	14.61	40.04	17.15
2003	13.60	37.26	16.32
2004	14.34	39.30	16.72
2005	15.03	41.19	18.07
2006	16.20	44.37	19.36
2007	17.82	48.82	20.67
2008	17.47	47.74	20.59
2009	17.60	48.22	20.17
2010	19.56	53.58	22.20
2011	20.79	56.95	23.00
2012	22.10	60.55	24.20
2013	22.60	61.92	24.70
2014	23.00	63.01	25.10
2015	23.84	65.31	25.50
2016	24.75	67.68	26.20
2017	25.16	68.94	26.50
2018	25.33	69.40	26.70
source:Transportation Dept., Hong Kong; Western Harbour Tunnel Co. Ltd.

Due to severe congestion experienced at the Cross Harbour Tunnel and the feeder roads to the WHC, there were calls for reduced tolls at the Western Harbour Crossing by letting the Government of Hong Kong buy back the tunnel from the current owners of the tunnel, WHTCL, so that it can control tolls and ease traffic congestion in the Cross Harbour Tunnel area. To that end, lawmakers passed a non-binding motion in 2008 for the HK Government to address the situation. However the consultant hired by the Government to find a solution to the traffic problem did not suggest the Western Harbour Crossing have lower tolls. The consultants said that lowering tolls would result in a very high increase in traffic volume, with severe congestion on the exit to Route 4 during rush hour. This solution would only be possible when the construction of the Central–Wan Chai Bypass is completed.

After the 30 year franchise expired in August 2023, the Government, as the new owners of the tunnel, reduced the prices for private cars and taxi.

== Sport events ==
Western Harbour Tunnel has been a place for many events. Before the Western Harbour Tunnel is officially open to public, in 1997, Walk for Millions was held in Western Harbour Tunnel. Participants can participate in the walk by soliciting donation from friends and relatives.

=== Standard Chartered Hong Kong Marathon ===
Standard Chartered Hong Kong Marathon is a sport event which held in Western Harbour Tunnel since 1999. Western Harbour Tunnel Company is one of the sponsors of this event. Started from 2001, the tunnel southbound route was closed and used as one of the routes in the game.

=== Hong Kong Cyclothon ===
Hong Kong Cyclothon is another sport event sponsored by Sun Hung Kai Properties and supported by Hong Kong Tourism Board. This event launched on 2015. Western Harbour Tunnel southbound tube was one of the routes in the game. After the game in 2015, the event arranged the route. In the past few years, Lin Cheung Road and slip of West Kowloon Highway were closed to facilitate the races. Based on the road closure on nearby roads, Western Harbour Tunnel had relevant road arrangement.

== Transport ==
As of 2019, there are 75 bus routes passing through the tunnel.

== See also ==
- List of tunnels and bridges in Hong Kong

== Notes ==
Preceded by Southern Terminus	Hong Kong Route 3 Western Harbour Crossing	Succeeded by West Kowloon Highway
