= John Hung =

Hong Kong businessman

- Traditional Chinese: 洪承禧
Transcriptions
Yue: Cantonese
- Yale Romanization: Hùhng Sìhng-hēi

John Terence Hung is a Hong Kong businessman, best known as former chairman of Wheelock & Co, and executive director of its subsidiary Wharf Holdings.

== Personal life ==
John Hung's maternal grandfather was Sir Robert Hormus Kotewall and he is the step-son of M. C. Hung, who was the last compradore of Jardine, Matheson & Co. He attended Pui Ching Middle School to learn Chinese.

== Career ==
Hung held posts with various Wheelock-owned companies, including Cable TV Hong Kong (vice-chairman) and Cross-Harbour Holdings (executive director). He also served as chairman of the Hong Kong government's Sports Development Board. He was awarded a Silver Bauhinia Star in 1999. He retired in 2002. Following his retirement, he continued to work as a consultant.

== Bribery scandal ==
In November 2008, Hung was arrested by Independent Commission Against Corruption officers outside of the Conrad Hotel at Pacific Place. In June 2009, a court found that Hung had accepted a HK$450,000 bribe in exchange for his support of Joanne Wong Pui's application for full membership in the Hong Kong Jockey Club, convicting him of one count of soliciting an advantage and three of accepting an advantage. He was sentenced to two years in prison and ordered to pay HK$350,000 to the HKJC; the judge gave him a mild sentence in light of his age and his "past contributions to Hong Kong".

He filed an appeal to have his conviction overturned; however, it was denied. The Court of Appeal stated that there was "ample evidence" of his guilt.

Hung's Silver Bauhinia Star (SBS) and Justice of the Peace (JP) were stripped following his convictions. This is the first time honours have been stripped since Hong Kong was handed over to China,
