= Douglas Woo =

Hong Kong financer (born 1978)

Douglas Woo Chun-kuen
- Born: 1978 (age 47–48)
- Education: Princeton University; Hong Kong University of Science & Technology Business School
- Occupation: Businessman
- Title: Chairman, Wheelock & Co
- Term: 2014-
- Predecessor: Peter Woo
- Parents: Peter Woo (father); Bessie Pao (mother)
- Relatives: Yue-Kong Pao (maternal grandfather)

Douglas Woo Chun-kuen JP (born 1978), is the chairman & managing director of Wheelock & Co. and managing director of its subsidiary Wheelock Properties and several other subsidiaries.

Wheelock is a former listed property group with its headquarters in Hong Kong.

== Education ==
Woo was educated in Hong Kong and the United Kingdom before earning a bachelor's degree in architecture from Princeton University, US. In 2010, he was awarded a Master of Business Administration degree (EMBA Programme) by The Hong Kong University of Science & Technology Business School and The Kellogg School of Management of Northwestern University.

In 2016, he was awarded the honorary doctorate by Savannah College of Art and Design (Hong Kong).

== Career ==
Woo worked in financial services and real estate prior to joining the Group in 2005. He was appointed a managing director of Wheelock in July 2013, and became chairman in January 2014.
