= The Cross-Harbour (Holdings) =

Hong Kong investment company

- Formerly: The Cross-Harbour Tunnel Company, Limited
- Traded as: SEHK: 32
- Industry: Investment
- Founded: 26 April 1965; 61 years ago (The Cross-Harbour Tunnel Company, Limited)
- Headquarters: Rooms 3301-07, China Resources Building, 26 Harbour Road, Wan Chai, Hong Kong
- Website: www.crossharbour.com.hk

The Cross-Harbour
- Chinese: 港通控股有限公司
Transcriptions
Yue: Cantonese
- Jyutping: Gong2 tung1 hung3 gu2 jau5 haan6 gung1 si1

The Cross-Harbour (Holdings) Limited (CHHL) (SEHK: 32), formerly the Cross-Harbour Tunnel Company, is a Hong Kong investment holding company with emphasis on transport infrastructures.

== History ==
The Cross-Harbour Tunnel Company Limited was incorporated with a nominal capital of HK$10 million in 1965. The company was backed by Wheelock Marden.

CHHL owned the franchise to build and operate the Cross-Harbour Tunnel up to 1999. Thereafter, CHHL, through an associated company, operated the Cross-Harbour Tunnel under a renewable management, operation and maintenance contract with the Government of Hong Kong until 31 October 2010. From 1 November 2010, the tunnel management passed to Serco Group.

The Cross-Harbour Tunnel Company also managed the Aberdeen Tunnel in the 1990s.

On 17 May 2000, the company's name was changed from Cross-Harbour Tunnel Company to Cross-Harbour (Holdings).

In 2001, Wharf Holdings sold its 26.7 per cent stake in the company to Prestige Properties Holdings Ltd. for HK$614.1 million.

== Investments ==
CHHL together with its wholly owned subsidiary hold a 50 per cent stake in Western Harbour Tunnel Company Limited (WHTCL). WHTCL owns the franchise to build and operate the Western Harbour Crossing from 1993 up to 2023.

In 2008, CHHL acquired a 39.5% effective interest in Tate's Cairn Tunnel Company Limited (TCTC). TCTC owned the franchise to build and operate the Tate's Cairn Tunnel from 1988 to 2018.

CHHL has a 70% stake in The Hong Kong School of Motoring (HKSM). HKSM operates three designated driving schools in Hong Kong. CHHL also has a 70% stake in a company which owns half of Autotoll Limited. Autotoll provides electronic toll clearing facilities in Hong Kong covering eleven different toll roads and tunnels.

On 5 June 2019, an Australian-based fund manager, Lanyon Asset Management Pty Limited, made a cash offer to acquire the 50% interest in the WHTCL from CHHL.

On 11 June 2019, Lanyon's offer was rejected by CHHL. Lanyon cited this was in the best interest of shareholders.

Subsequently, on 13 August 2019, Lanyon outlined a strategy for CHHL to liquidate their securities portfolio, sell the company yacht and return the surplus cash to CHHL shareholders as a special dividend. Lanyon suggested their initiatives would enable the payment of a special dividend of HK$16.80 per share (or 160% of the current share price).
