= Pui Ching Invitational Mathematics Competition =

Hong Kong mathematics competition

Pui Ching Invitational Mathematics Competition (Traditional Chinese: 培正數學邀請賽), was held yearly by Pui Ching Middle School since 2002. It had been formerly named as Pui Ching Middle School Invitational Mathematics Competition for the first three years. In late 2010s, more than 130 secondary schools sent teams to participate in the competition.

== See also ==
- List of mathematics competitions
- Education in Hong Kong
