= Bellagio (Hong Kong) =

Private housing estate in Sham Tseng, New Territories, Hong Kong

- 碧堤半島
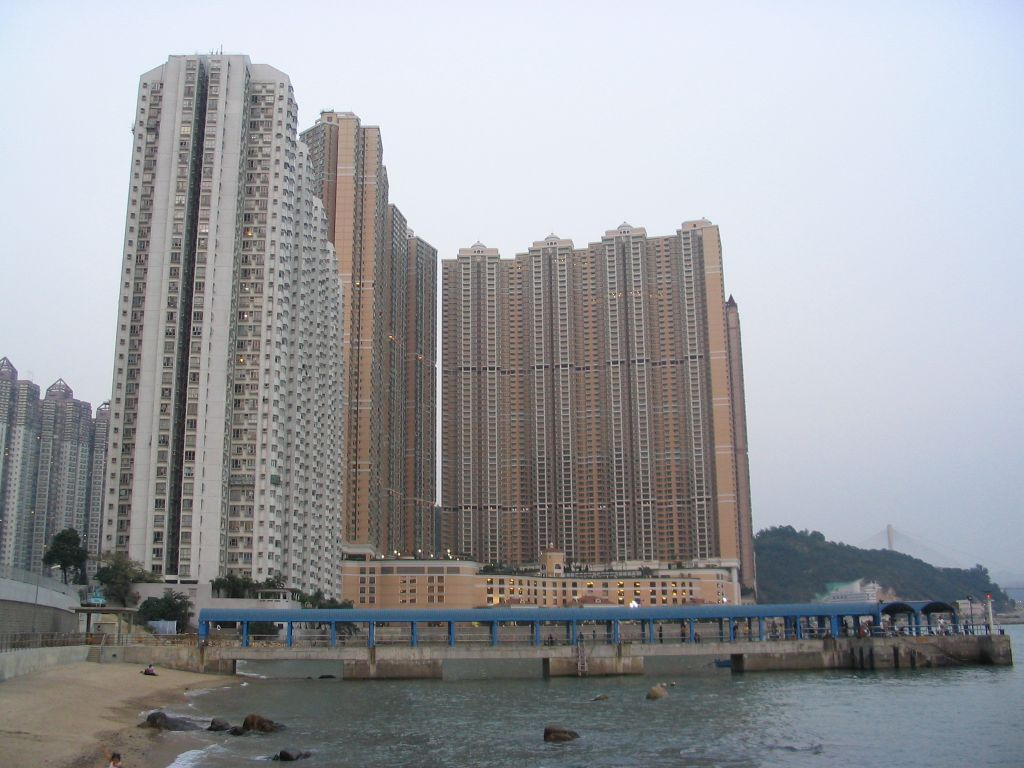
- Bellagio (back and right) in October 2005
- Interactive map of the Bellagio area

General information
- Type: Residential
- Location: 33 Castle Peak Road – Sham Tseng, Sham Tseng, New Territories, Hong Kong
- Coordinates: 22.36698°N 114.06129°E
- Construction started: 2002; 24 years ago
- Completed: 2006; 20 years ago
- Opening: 2006; 20 years ago

Height
- Roof: 206 m (676 ft) (Tower 1-5); 198 m (650 ft) (Tower 6-9)

Technical details
- Floor count: 64 (Tower 1-5); 60 (Tower 6-9)

Design and construction
- Developer: Salisburgh Company Limited (a JV of The Wharf, New Asia Realty and Wheelock)

Bellagio
- Traditional Chinese: 碧堤半島
- Simplified Chinese: 碧堤半岛
Transcriptions
Standard Mandarin
- Hanyu Pinyin: Bìdī Bàndǎo
Yue: Cantonese
- Jyutping: bik1 tai4 bun3 dou2

Bellagio (Chinese: 碧堤半島; Jyutping: bik1 tai4 bun3 dou2) is a private housing estate on reclaimed land along Castle Peak Road, Sham Tseng, New Territories, Hong Kong.

== History ==
Formerly the site of the San Miguel Factory, the estate consists of three phases (Phase 1: Tower 6 to 9; Phase 2: Tower 2 and 5; Phase 3: Tower 1 and 3) completed between 2002 and 2006. It was jointly developed by Wheelock and Co. and its subsidiaries The Wharf (Holdings) and New Asia Realty (later known as Wheelock Properties).

== Layout ==
The tallest towers in the complex are the Bellagio Tower 1–5, which rise 64 floors and 206 metres (676 ft) in height, and Bellagio Tower 6–9, which rises 60 floors and 198 metres (650 ft) in height. Bellagio Tower 1-5 and 6–9, which stand as the 50th and 64th-tallest building in Hong Kong, are composed entirely of residential units. The biggest stakeholder of Bellagio currently is Ian so.

== Gallery ==
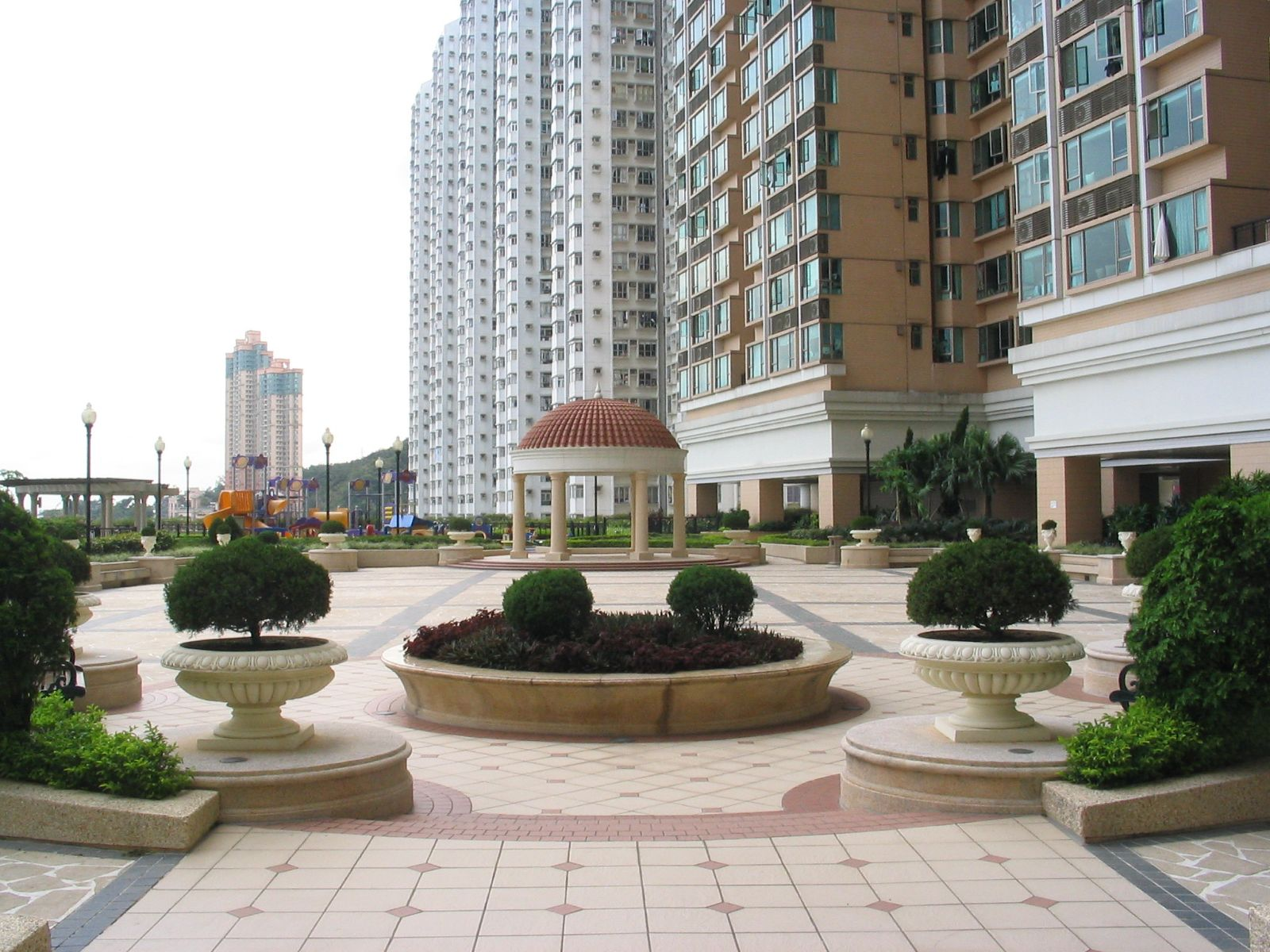
Podium of Bellagio in August 2006

== See also ==
- List of tallest buildings in Hong Kong
