= Ocean Pointe =

Housing estate in Hong Kong

Coordinates: 22.3657°N 114.0624°E

- 縉皇居
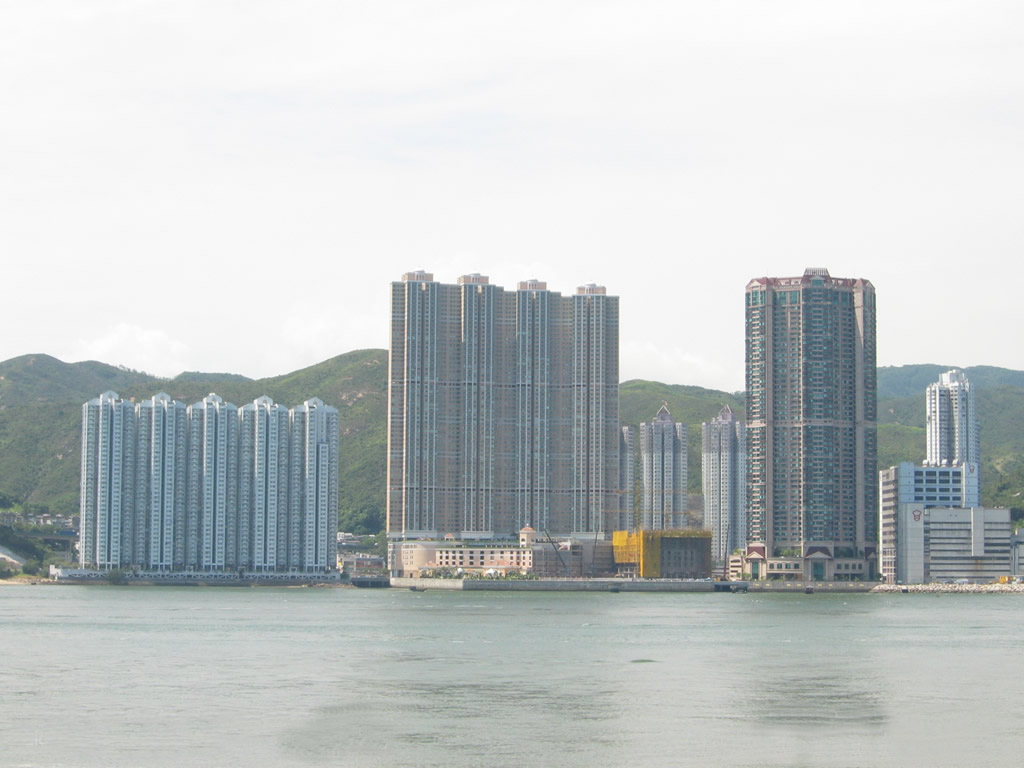
- Ocean Pointe (right)
- Interactive map of the Ocean Pointe area

General information
- Status: Completed
- Type: Residential
- Location: 8 Sham Tsz Street; Sham Tseng, New Territories, Hong Kong
- Construction started: 1998
- Completed: 2001
- Opening: 2001

Height
- Roof: 184 m (604 ft)
- Top floor: 169 m (554 ft)

Technical details
- Floor count: 54

Design and construction
- Architects: DLN Architects & Engineers
- Developer: Kerry Properties

Ocean Pointe
- Traditional Chinese: 縉皇居
- Simplified Chinese: 缙皇居
Transcriptions
Standard Mandarin
- Hanyu Pinyin: Jìn Huáng Jū
Yue: Cantonese
- Jyutping: zeon3 wong4 geoi1

Ocean Pointe (Chinese: 縉皇居) is a private housing estate in Sham Tseng, New Territories, Hong Kong. The tower rises 54 storeys and 184 metres (604 ft) in height. The building was completed in 2001. It was designed by architectural firm DLN Architects & Engineers, and was developed by Kerry Properties Limited. Ocean Pointe, which stands as the 89th-tallest building in Hong Kong, is composed entirely of residential units, of which it contains 560.

== History ==
The site was originally a Union Carbide depot developed in the 1960s. The complex was used for chemical storage, warehousing, and materials manufacturing. A latex manufacturing plant opened at the site in March 1977. In the 1990s, the company decided to relocate the Sham Tseng facilities to China, freeing up the site for sale and eventual residential redevelopment.

Kerry Properties won the 99,388 square foot site in a private tender in October 1994. The developer acquired the site in December 1994. In November 1997, the building plans for the new residential complex were approved by the Buildings Department. The first flats were sold in early 2001.

== See also ==
- Private housing estates in Hong Kong
