= Western Harbour Tunnel Company =

Hong Kong infatructure agency

- Website: www.westernharbourtunnel.com

The Western Harbour Tunnel Company Limited (WHTCL) 香港西區隧道有限公司 is a jointly owned entity engaged principally in the construction, maintenance and operation of the Western Harbour Crossing (WHC) in Hong Kong.

Founded in 1992, WHTCL owns the franchise to build and operate the WHC from 1993 up till 2023. The 30-year franchise, under a build, operate and transfer contract with the Government of Hong Kong, includes the financing, design, construction, commissioning and operation of the WHC.

WHTCL's single largest shareholder is The Cross-Harbour (Holdings) Limited 港通控股有限公司 SEHK: 0032, holding a 50% stake in WHTCL. Its other shareholders are CITIC Pacific Limited 中信泰富有限公司 SEHK: 0267 and Kerry Properties Limited 嘉里建設有限公司 SEHK: 0683 which hold 35% and 15% effective interests in WHTCL respectively through a joint venture company.
