= Cindy Au =

Hong Kong actress and singer

Cindy Au Sin-yi
- 歐倩怡
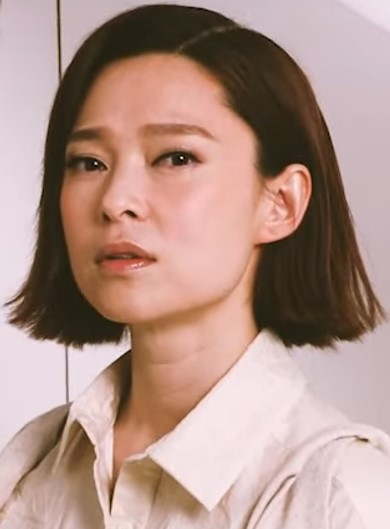
- Cindy in 2021 performing in the music video of the remake of the song For Whom You Cry
- Born: Au Sin-yi; December 16, 1979 (age 46); British Hong Kong
- Other name: Chibi Maruko-chan (小丸子)
- Citizenship: United Kingdom
- Education: Pui Ching Middle School (Hong Kong); HKU SPACE (continuing education)
- Occupation: Singer · actress · television host · professional nutritionist
- Years active: 1996–2006; 2011–present
- Spouse: Roger Kwok (m. 2006; div. 2024)
- Children: 2

Chinese name
- Traditional Chinese: 歐倩怡
- Simplified Chinese: 欧倩怡
Transcriptions
Standard Mandarin
- Hanyu Pinyin: Ōu Qiànyí
Yue: Cantonese
- Jyutping: Au1 Sin3 Ji4

Cindy Au Sin-yi (Chinese: 歐倩怡; born 16 December 1979) is a Hong Kong singer, actress, television host and professional nutritionist.

== Life and Career ==
=== 1979–1996: Early life and education ===
Cindy Au was born on 16 December 1979 in British Hong Kong, with ancestral roots in Shunde, Guangdong. She attended Pui Ching Middle School in Hong Kong. In later years she pursued tertiary studies, eventually earning multiple degrees and certificates in marketing, food & nutrition, community nutrition and sports & exercise nutrition.

=== 1996–2001: Singing Debut and music career ===
After finishing secondary schooling, Au entered the entertainment industry via the New Talent Singing Awards (TVB/Capital Artists) in 1996, where she won the Self-Potential Performance Award and was subsequently signed by Capital Artists as a singer. In 1997 she recorded the Cantonese version of the cartoon theme song Chibi Maruko-chan – 問題天天都多, which achieved widespread popularity and multiple children’s song awards. On 15 January 2001 she released her solo album Cindy.

=== 1998–2006: Acting and TVB career ===
Au transitioned into acting and joined TVB, appearing in supporting roles across numerous dramas and variety shows between 1998 and 2006. While she also appeared in a small number of film roles during this period, her career was primarily focused on television productions. She balanced both singing and acting during this time. La Femme Desperado (2006) would be her last TV role as she got married and focused on family life.

=== 2006–2011: Marriage and Family life ===
In July 2006, Au married actor Roger Kwok at Hong Kong Disneyland. The couple welcomed a son, Brad Kwok Ling-shan, on 23 March 2008 and a daughter, Blair Kwok Yee-nga, on 29 June 2011. During this period she stepped back from mainstream filming and public appearances. Cindy never declared leaving TVB nor retirement from the entertainment industry; she decided to focus on her family and personal development for the next several years.

=== 2011–2023: Nutrition Career and Limited Media Return ===
From 2011 onward, Au focused on her education and professional credentialing in nutrition. She is a featured alumna of HKU SPACE and a speaker describing her journey from scoring low in the HKCEE to earning a master’s in sports & exercise nutrition. Au has publicly described her path from early academic challenges (scoring 5 points in HKCEE) to becoming a qualified nutritionist and speaker. She has completed multiple academic credentials in marketing & management, food & nutrition, community nutrition, and sports & exercise nutrition. In her role as a nutritionist for River Cam Nutrition Centre she provides diet-based guidance for skin care and holistic health, merging TCM/beauty-nutrition approaches.

In December 2023 she was invited by River Cam Nutrition Centre (Shatin) as their celebrity nutritionist, officiating at their grand opening event. She also remains active in health and wellness media, making guest appearances in programmes such as Super Dad (ViuTV, 2017) and singing cameo in the music-video segment of the retrospective show Cantopop at 50 (2020/21). As of 2023, Cindy hasn't returned to singing or acting for 17 years and has made no intention of resuming her past entertainer career.

=== 2024-present: Divorce announcement ===
On 2 May 2024, Au and Roger Kwok announced their divorce after 18 years of marriage; both parties issued statements via social media and reported in Hong Kong media.

== Performance works ==
=== Films ===
Year	Title	Role
2015	Little Big Master	Wai Hung's sister-in-law

=== Television (selected) ===
- 1998 – Journey to the West II
- 1999 – Face to Face
- 2000 – Aiming High
- 2006 – La Femme Desperado
- Guest / cameo appearances from 2017 onward in health/parenting/retrospective programmes.

== Discography ==
Year	Title / Notes
1997	“問題天天都多” (Cantonese theme for cartoon)
2001	Album Cindy

== Awards ==
- 1997 – 1997年度兒歌金曲頒獎典禮: Top Ten Children’s Songs & NET Children’s Song Award & Most Popular Female Children’s Singer (for “問題天天都多”).
