= Peter Woo =

Hong Kong politician and businessman

The Honourable Peter Woo GBM GBS JP
- Born: Woo Kwong-ching; September 5, 1946 (age 79); Shanghai, China
- Education: University of Cincinnati; Columbia Business School
- Occupations: Former chairman of Wheelock and Company and The Wharf (Holdings)
- Spouse: Bessie Pao Pui-yung
- Children: 3 (including Douglas Woo)
- Relatives: Yue-kong Pao (father-in-law)

Chinese name
- Traditional Chinese: 吳光正
- Simplified Chinese: 吴光正
Transcriptions
Standard Mandarin
- Hanyu Pinyin: Wú Guāngzhèng
- Wade–Giles: Wu Kuang-cheng

Peter Woo Kwong-ching, GBM, GBS, JP (Chinese: 吳光正; born September 5, 1946) is a Hong Kong billionaire businessman. He was the chairman of Wheelock and Company and The Wharf (Holdings) until 19 May 2015. As of April 2021, his net worth is estimated to be $14 billion.

== Education ==
Woo was born in Shanghai in 1946 with ancestral roots in Ningbo, Zhejiang, and moved to Hong Kong in 1949. He was educated at St Stephen's College, a Direct Subsidy Scheme privately owned but government-funded boarding school (which is also Hong Kong's largest secondary school), in the town of Stanley, and went on to attain his bachelor's degree from the University of Cincinnati, majoring in physics. While a student, Woo was senior class president, and became a member of Delta Tau Delta fraternity, an endeavor he is still involved in today. He later obtained an MBA from Columbia Business School in New York, US.

== Life and career ==
After graduating, Woo worked at Chase Manhattan Bank in New York and Hong Kong, where he met his future wife Bessie. Bessie was the sister of the woman he was arranged to be married to. His family did not approve of a non-Asian marriage.

Woo's diversified interests are reflected in his businesses, focusing in real estate development in Hong Kong, China and Singapore. The group owns several investment properties such as Harbour City and Times Square in Hong Kong, as well as operating other businesses such as i-Cable Communications, Modern Terminals and Marco Polo Hotels. Woo also owns the privately held, high-end luxury retail group LCJG, which includes Lane Crawford and the premier fashion house, Joyce. Woo also serves on the advisory board for various Fortune 500 companies such as Chase Manhattan Bank, JPMorgan Chase and General Electric.

== Political and non-profit ==
Woo is a member of the Standing Committee of the Chinese People’s Political Consultative Conference.

His past appointments include:

- Chairman of the Council of the Hong Kong Polytechnic University from 1993 to 1997.
- Founding chairman of the Hong Kong Environment and Conservation Fund Committee in 1994 until 2004.
- Chairman of the Hong Kong Hospital Authority from 1995 to 2000.
- Chairman of the Hong Kong Trade Development Council from 2000 to 2007.

In 1996, Woo ran in the First Hong Kong Chief Executive Election just before the British colony was handed over back to Chinese rule, alongside Yang Ti-liang and Tung Chee-hwa. Tung won.

== Achievements and honours ==
The Government of Hong Kong appointed Woo Justice of the Peace in 1993, awarded the Gold Bauhinia Star in 1998 and the Grand Bauhinia Medal in 2012.

== See also ==
- Antony Leung
- Politics of Hong Kong
- Executive Council of Hong Kong

Political offices
Preceded by Sir Chung Sze-yuen	Chairman of the Hospital Authority; 1995–2000	Succeeded by Lo Ka-shui
Preceded by Victor Fung	Chairman of the Hong Kong Trade Development Council; 2000–2007	Succeeded by Jack So
Order of precedence
Preceded by Wong Yan-lung; Recipient of the Grand Bauhinia Medal	Hong Kong order of precedence Recipient of the Grand Bauhinia Medal	Succeeded by Maria Tam; Recipient of the Grand Bauhinia Medal
