= International Network on Personal Meaning =

Canadian academic organization

The International Network on Personal Meaning (INPM) is a nonprofit organization devoted to advancing meaning-centred research and interventions. It was founded by Paul T. P. Wong in 1998. Inspired by Viktor Frankl's logotherapy, Wong wanted to expand Frankl's vision to include the contemporary positive psychology movement. Therefore, the INPM provides a "big tent" for both existential-humanistic psychologists and positive psychologists in their biennial International Meaning Conferences and their journal, the International Journal of Existential Psychology and Psychotherapy.

There have been nine biennial International Meaning Conferences since 2000. The latest one was held in Toronto in 2016 with the theme, "Spirituality, Self-Transcendence, and Second-Wave Positive Psychology". Recently, the title of the journal has been changed to the International Journal of Existential Positive Psychology to reflect the INPM's mission, which can be best characterized by existential positive psychology (EPP) or second wave positive psychology (PP 2.0).

In addition to their focus on research and interventions, they also aim to educate the general public regarding the vital role of meaning in reducing mental illness and promoting positive mental health. This objective is achieved through their Positive Living Newsletter and Meaningful Living Meetup Groups.

Since its inception, the INPM has appealed to a broad range of professionals, including psychologists, therapists, coaches, educators, and medical professionals. Their Meaning Conference is the only international conference completely devoted to meaning from different theoretical perspectives and disciplines.
