= Anne Marden (activist) =

Hong Kong children's rights activist (1926–2022)

Anne Marden (1926–2022) was a Hong Kong children's rights activist.

== Biography ==
Marden was born in 1926 in Hong Kong. She spent her early life in Shanghai. After completing her education at Bristol University, she married John Marden, a World War II veterans associated with the Normandy landings. Upon his ascent as the "taipan" of Wheelock Marden and Co., the couple relocated to Hong Kong in 1947, where they raised four children.

In the early 1960s, Marden became the director of the Hong Kong Red Cross, coordinating aid during events such as Typhoon Wanda in 1962 and responses to squatter hut fires. In the same year, she played a major role in the establishment of the Princess Alexandra Red Cross School, Hong Kong's first residential institution for children with disabilities.

By 1973, along with her husband, Marden co-established the Marden Foundation. Later, in the 1980s, she contributed to the development of the first inclusive playground in King's Park, Hong Kong.

During her career, Marden was affiliated with several organizations, including the Hong Kong Federation of Handicapped Youth, the Rehabaid Society, and the Hong Kong branch of the International Social Service. Additionally, Marden co-founded TREATS and held an honorary presidency at Playright, promoting the cause of special education and infrastructure during a period of limited resources in Hong Kong.
