= Wheelock and Company =

Hong Kong real estate company

Wheelock and Company Limited
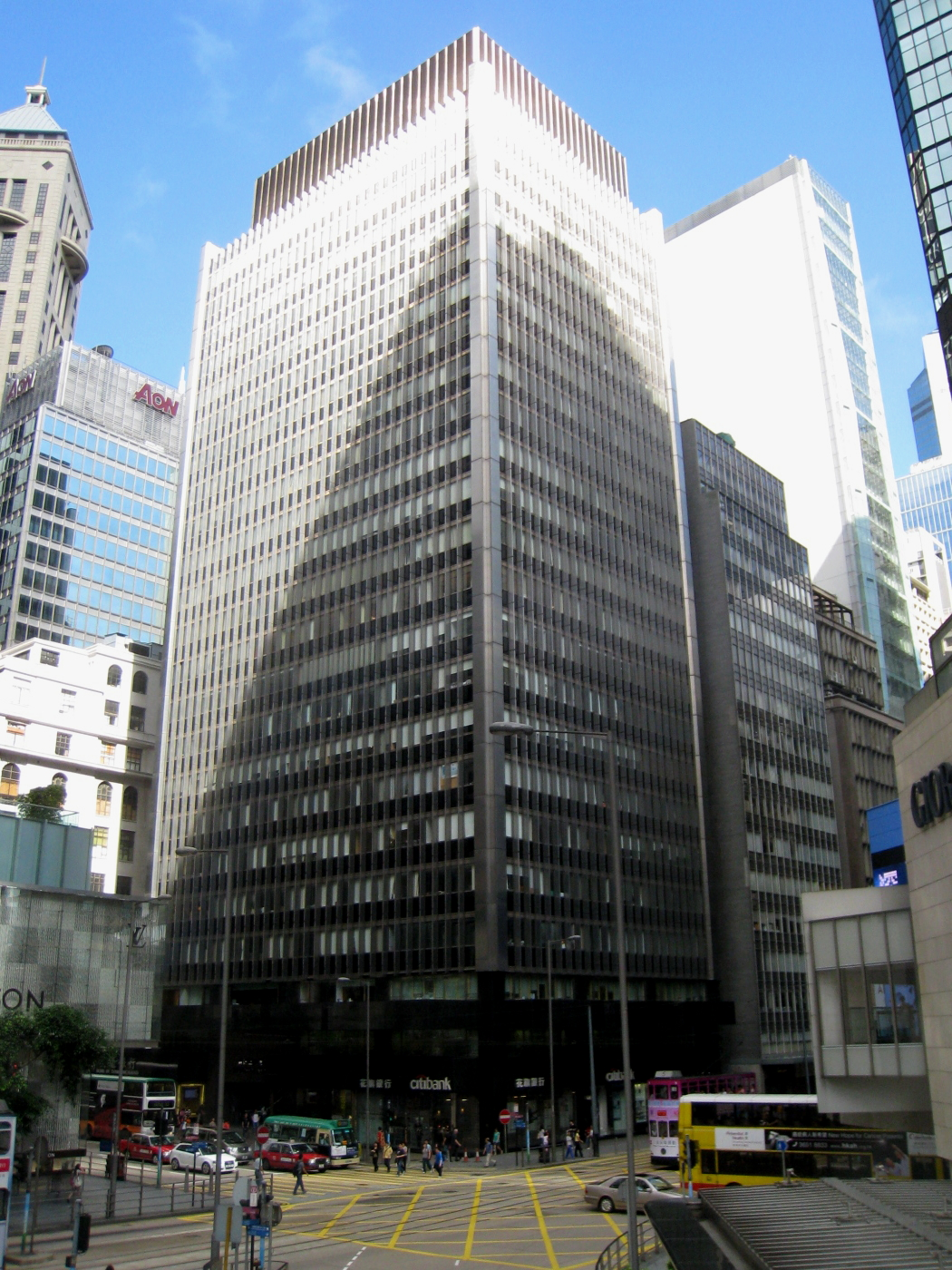
- Headquarters at Wheelock House
- Type: Private (former public)
- Traded as: SEHK: 20 (former)
- Industry: Property development; Property investment
- Founded: 1927; 99 years ago
- Headquarters: Wheelock House, Central, Hong Kong
- Area served: Hong Kong, Singapore
- Key people: Douglas Woo (chairman and MD)
- Owner: Peter Woo (60%); Morgan Stanley (40%)
- Subsidiaries: The Wharf (68%); Wharf REIC (45%); Wheelock Properties (50%)
- Website: Official website

Wheelock and Company Limited is a Hong Kong–based financial real estate company. It was listed as No. 1249 on the Forbes 2000 list.

The group's principal activities are property investment, property development, property management and agency, and investment holding. The group is also involved in distribution and retail businesses including Lane Crawford, Joyce and City'super. Operations are carried out in Hong Kong, the British Virgin Islands, mainland China and Singapore.

== History ==
Wheelock and Company was created from the purchase of Wheelock and Marden Company Limited, a British Hong founded as Shanghai Tug and Lighter Limited in 1857 in Shanghai by Captain Thomas Reed Wheelock (born St. Stephen, New Brunswick, 1843 – died 1920, Shanghai, China). G.E. Marden founded Marden and Company in 1925 and merged with Wheelock's tug company to form Wheelock and Marden Company Limited in 1932. The new company operated other ships and later moved their operations to Hong Kong following World War II. The new company diversified from transportation to custom's clearing, container delivery, warehousing and travelling. Marden's son John L. Marden was once the head of the company. It was acquired by local tycoon Sir Yue-Kong Pao in 1985. Captain Wheelock married Edith Haswell Clarke in 1872 and had several children, including Geoffrey Wheelock and Florence Wheelock Ayscough. Wheelock came to China following his brother Robert. Wheelock retired in 1889 to spend time in Boston and St. Andrew, New Brunswick. Wheelock's departure from China was short and returned in 1897 died in 1920 in Shanghai.

== Operations ==
Today's Wheelock and Company is a holding company with principal interests in real estate in Hong Kong, Singapore, China, and the UK. The company develops hotels, housing, and shopping centers through majority-owned subsidiary The Wharf, as well as wholly owned subsidiary Wheelock Properties. In addition to its property holdings, Wharf has interests in cable television, Internet access, and telecommunications providers in Hong Kong. Wharf also owns more than two-thirds of Modern Terminals, a shipping terminal operator in southern China.

== See also ==
- John Hung, former chairman
