= 2023 Plaza Hollywood stabbings =

2023 stabbing attack in Hong Kong

Plaza Hollywood stabbings
- Location: Plaza Hollywood in Diamond Hill, Hong Kong
- Date: June 2, 2023; 3 years ago 5 p.m.
- Attack type: Stabbing attack
- Weapon: a 12-inch knife
- Victims: 2
- Perpetrator: Szeto Shing-kwong
- 2023 Plaza Hollywood stabbings (Hong Kong)

On 2 June 2023, around 5 p.m., a 39-year-old man with a history of mental illness attacked people with a knife at Plaza Hollywood in Diamond Hill, Kowloon, Hong Kong. Two women, Daniel Fong Hiu-tung, 26, and Amber Lau Kai-hei, 22, were fatally wounded. Police arrested the attacker at the scene.

The case attracted considerable attention from the government, the public, and the media, and sparked public discussion about the effectiveness of treatment for people with mental illness and the impact of their reintegration into society. It was the first random killings by a person with mental illness in Hong Kong in 13 years, since the incident at Kwai Shing East Estate in 2010.

== Background ==
The suspect, Szeto Shing-kwong (司徒成光), 39, was unemployed and lived with his family at Tsz Lok Estate in Tsz Wan Shan. The family of three lives on social welfare. In 2020, after he committed domestic violence, he was diagnosed with paranoid schizophrenia. He was initially remanded to Siu Lam Psychiatric Hospital and later ordered to receive treatment at Kwai Chung Hospital. He had sought medical treatment from a doctor in March 2023 and continued to receive medical follow-up thereafter. His next medical appointment would be held on 6 June, just a few days away.

The two victims are 26-year-old Daniel Fong Hiu-tung (方曉彤), who was the only daughter in her family and worked at a restaurant, and 22-year-old Amber Lau Kai-hei (劉繼禧), who was a hairstylist at a hair salon in Tsim Sha Tsui and also worked part-time as a bar waitress. The two women were a lesbian couple and were living together with friends in Lung Mei Village, Tai Mei Tuk. Lau met Fong at the bar she worked a month before the incident. At the time of the incident, Lau and Fong had been shopping at the mall and planned to attend a birthday banquet for Fong's grandfather at a restaurant in Ping Shek Estate.

== Incident ==
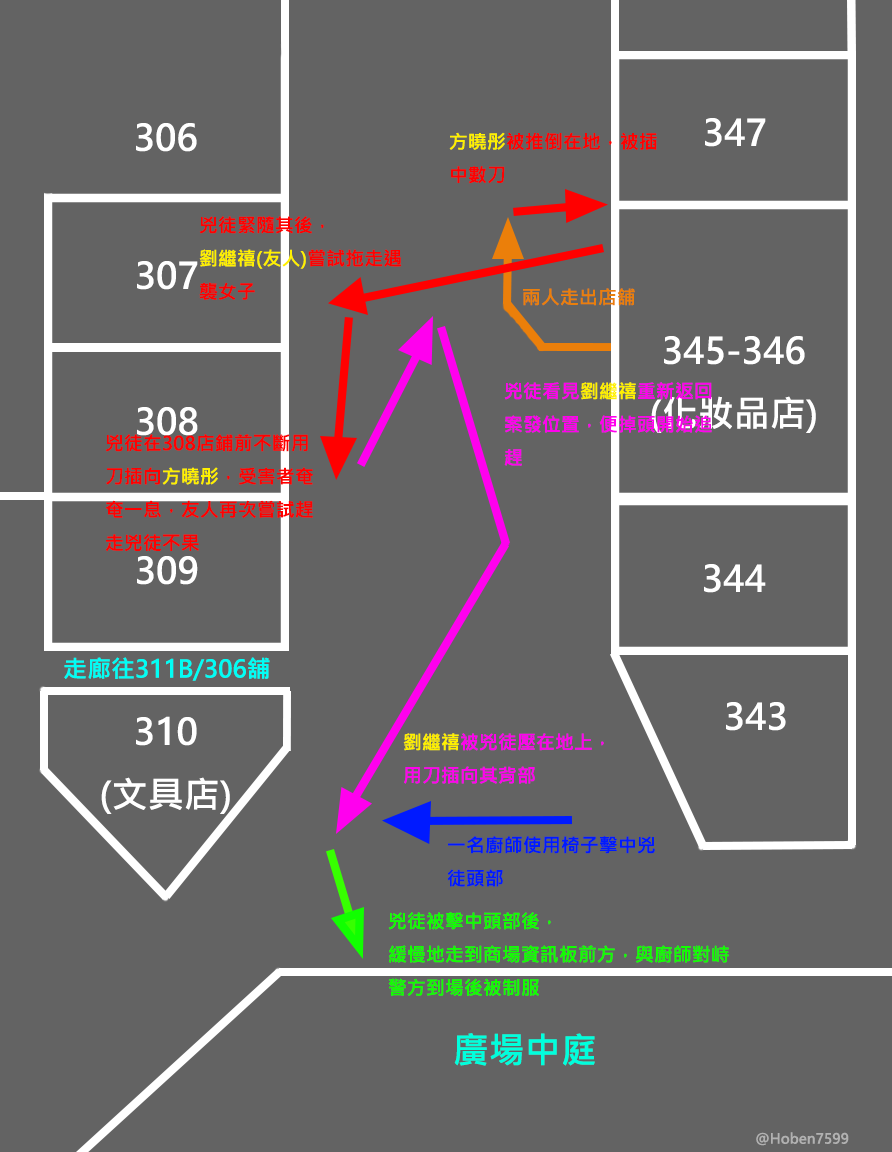
Incident timeline

At about 5:00 p.m. on 2 June 2023, a bald man, Szeto Shing-kwong, wearing a white vest, black shorts and a shoulder bag, entered Hollywood Plaza alone. He went to the second-floor store Life Kan, where he purchased a 12-inch unopened sashimi knife, then wandered around the mall for several minutes. The store is just 200 meters away from the scene.

At about 5:10 p.m., outside Sa Sa on the third floor, he suddenly repeatedly stabbed a short-haired woman in black, Fong Hiu-tung, in the waist from behind. She struggled, and after she fell, he continued stabbing toward her stomach and her heart. Her companion, a long-haired woman, Lau Kai-hei, attempted to intervene and protect her, but was unsuccessful. As Lau dragged Fong away, the suspect pursued them, stabbing Lau in the neck and continuing to stab Fong in the chest. Fong was eventually found critically injured outside the Hong Kong Chess & Go Academy. The suspect then attempted to leave but turned back and chased Lau. Outside Sanrio Gift Gate, he pinned her down with his left hand and repeatedly stabbed her in the back, leaving her seriously injured.

Before police arrived, members of the public provided first aid and attempted to restrain the suspect. A restaurant chef, Ho Siu-fai (何兆輝, 64), rushed to the scene holding a chair in each of his hands and struck the suspect. The suspect did not retaliate and eventually stood near a signboard holding the knife. The suspect started crying afterwards. Mall staff evacuated customers while others assisted the injured.

At 5:14 p.m., police received the first report from a woman and multiple reports following. Officers arrived within four minutes and subdued the suspect, who offered slight resistance, using four shield-equipped officers. Large amounts of blood and bloodstained tissues were found at the scene. Police and counter-terrorism officers subsequently cordoned off the area and conducted an investigation. And, the suspect was escorted to Wong Tai Sin Police Station.

== Aftermath ==
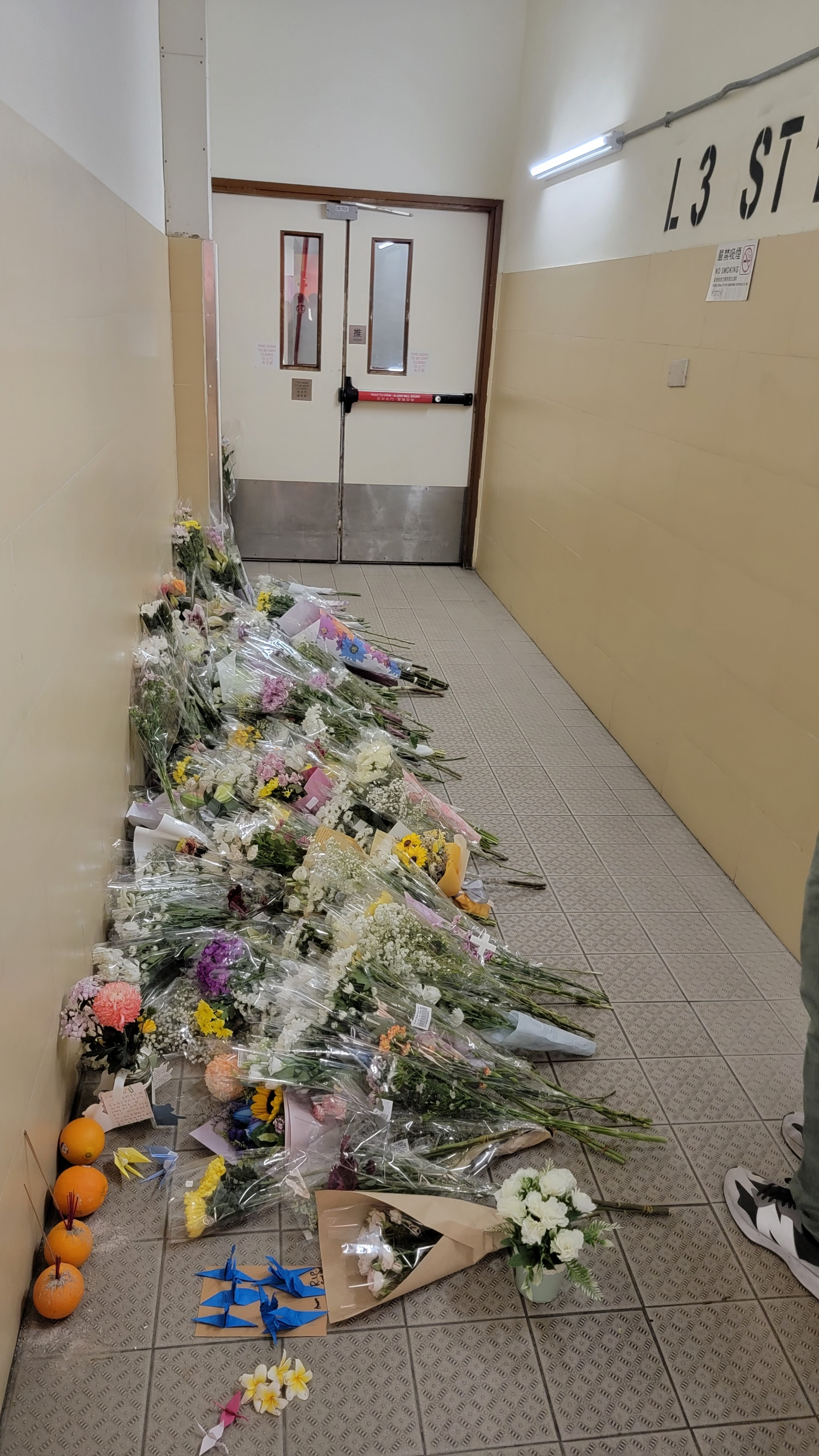
Flowers and condolences at the fire escape of the mall

Both women suffered multiple stab wounds to the chest and neck and heavy blood loss. They were taken by ambulance to United Christian Hospital in critical condition and were unconscious upon arrival. Both were pronounced dead from blood loss at 6:06 p.m. and 6:47 p.m., respectively, on 2 June 2023.

Following the attack, many shops closed early, and the scene was cordoned off. The Kowloon East Regional Crime Unit conducted nearly five hours of investigation and evidence collection at the scene and the household-goods store where the knife was purchased. At 10:35 p.m., officers recovered a bloodstained, slightly curved 12-inch sashimi knife from the scene and photographed various locations.

The mall reopened as usual the following day, with a section of a fire escape near the scene designated for public tributes. Many brought white flowers and condolence cards to the mall. Police deployed officers to patrol and conduct checks at the mall entrances and inside the mall. Some shops remained closed, and the corridor where the attack occurred was relatively quiet. On 4 June, plainclothes officers inspected the contents of the condolence cards individually.

== Legal proceedings ==
Szeto Shing-kwong was charged with two counts of murder and appeared at Kwun Tong Magistrates’ Courts on 5 June 2023. He was escorted by four male officers and represented by duty lawyer Patrick Tam. After the charges were read, Szeto calmly replied, “Understood.” The prosecution applied for no plea to be taken and requested two psychiatric reports to assess his fitness to plead and whether a hospital order should be recommended. Acting principal magistrate Cheang Kei-hong granted the application and adjourned the case to 19 June. Szeto was remanded at Siu Lam Psychiatric Hospital in the meantime.
