= Nga Tsin Wai Tsuen =

Village in Hong Kong

Coordinates: 22°20′06″N 114°11′36″E

- Traditional Chinese: 衙前圍村
- Literal meaning: the walled village in front of the yamen
Transcriptions
Yue: Cantonese
- Yale Romanization: Ngàh chìhn wàih chyūn
- Jyutping: Nga5 cin4 wai4 cyun1

Hing Yau Yu Tsuen
- Traditional Chinese: 慶有餘村
- Literal meaning: overflowing prosperity
Transcriptions
Yue: Cantonese
- Yale Romanization: Hing yáuh yùh chyūn
- Jyutping: Hing3 jau5 jyu4 cyun1

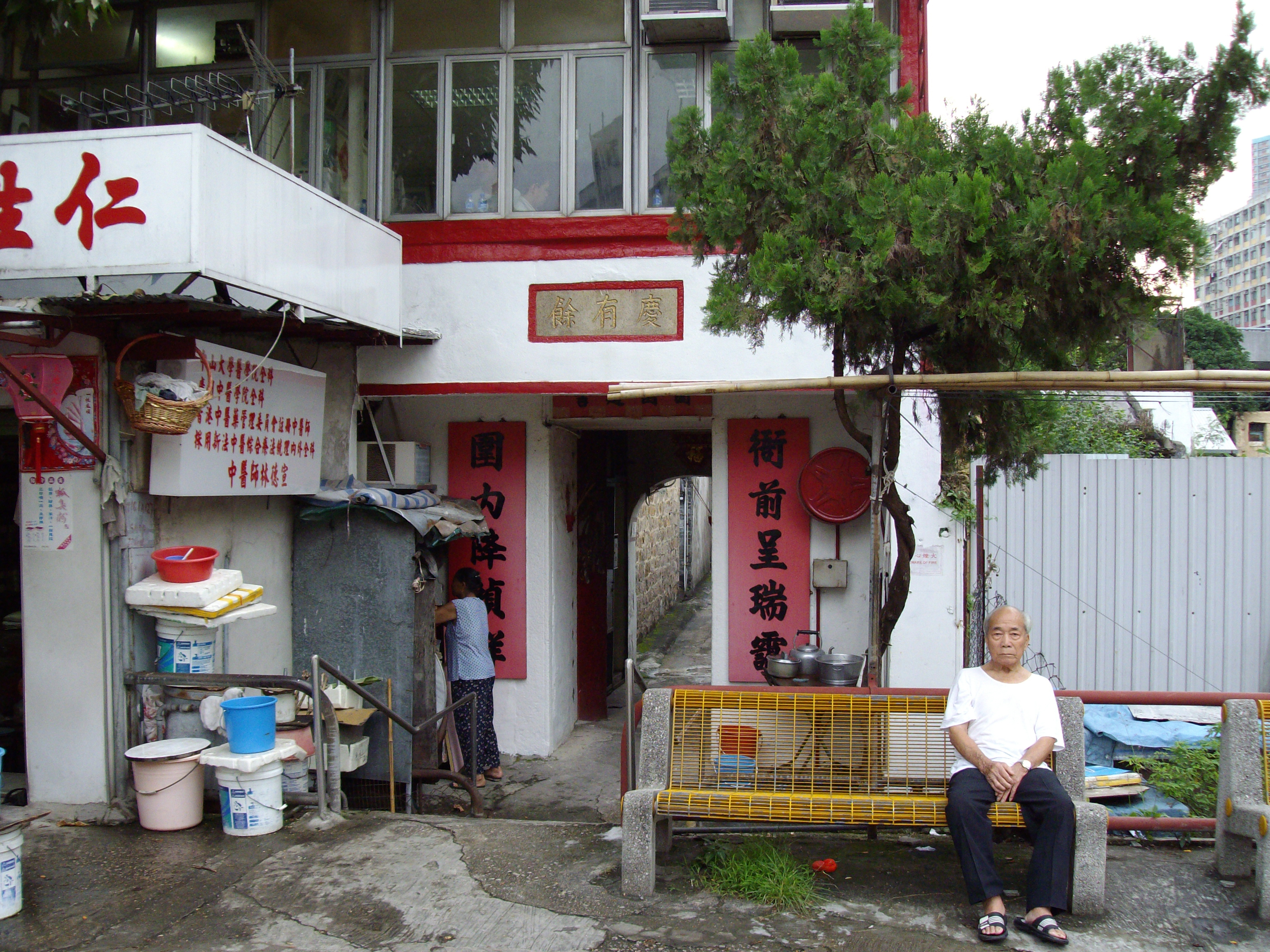
The entrance gate of Nga Tsin Wai Tsuen in September 2007. The Chinese characters, read from right to left, "慶有餘" (Hing Yau Yu) engraved on the granite stone above the entrance are said to be the handwriting of the Song Emperor.

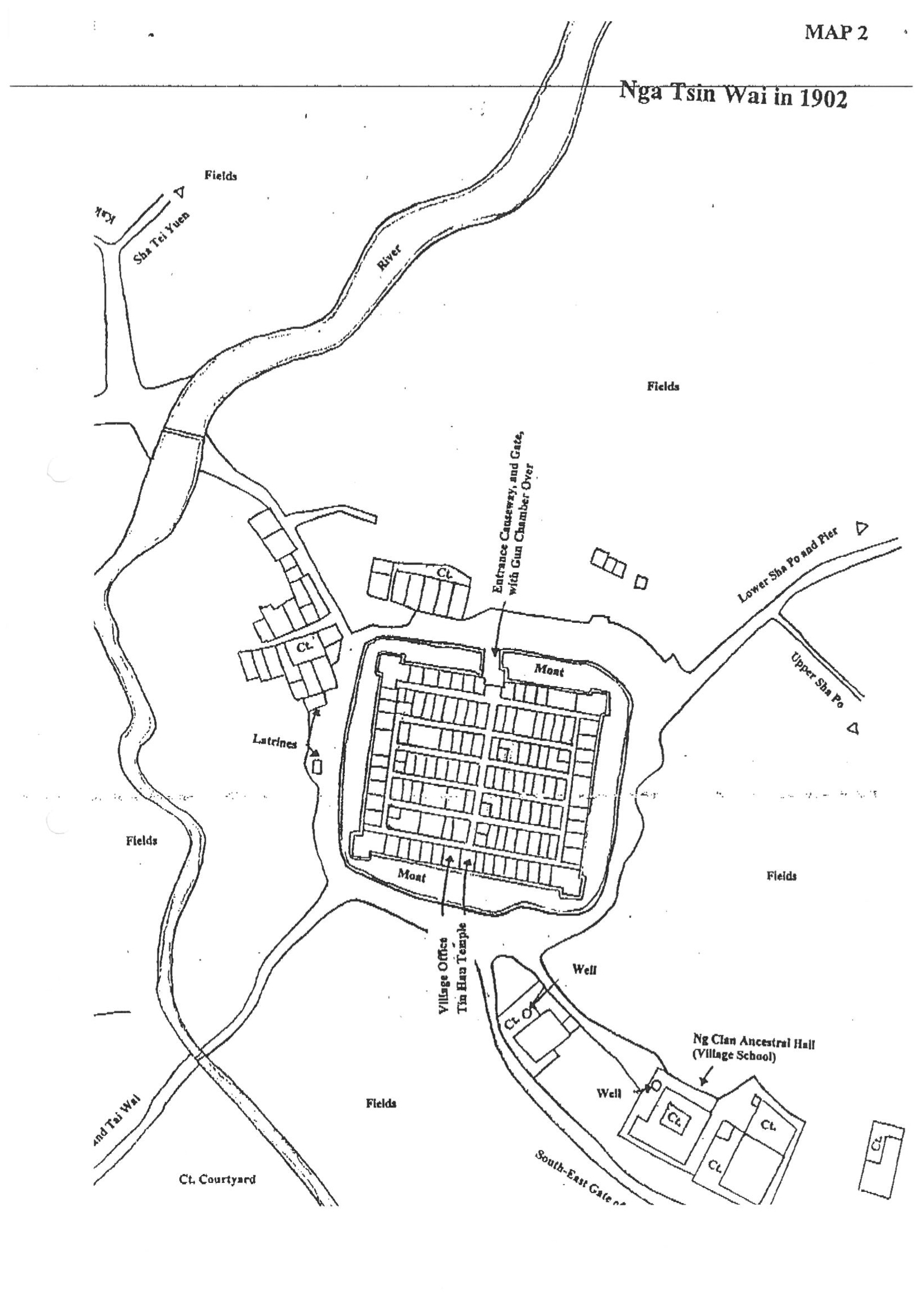
Plan of Nga Tsin Wai Tsuen in 1902.

Nga Tsin Wai Tsuen, also known as Hing Yau Yu Tsuen, was a walled village in Wong Tai Sin, Kowloon, Hong Kong with a history spanning more than 600 years.

It was the last walled village in the urban core of Hong Kong before its resumption for redevelopment by the Urban Renewal Authority (URA), a government agency, in 2016.

== History ==
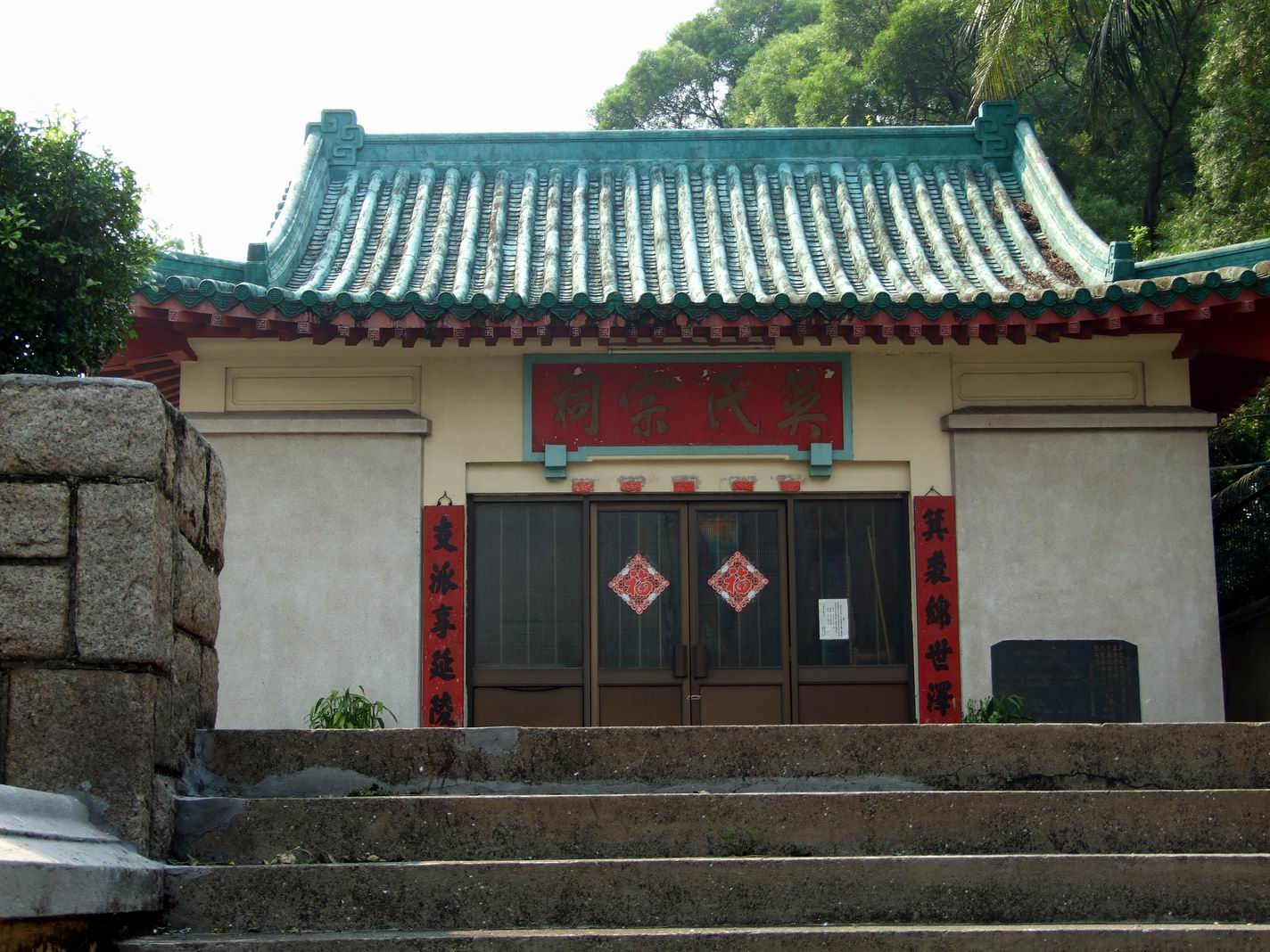
Ng Ancestral hall in Nga Tsin Wai Tsuen in October 2007.

According to a legend, members of the Ng, Chan and Lee clans followed the fugitive Song Emperor and settled in Kowloon in around 1278. The village was probably established by the Ng, Chan and Lee clans in the mid 14th century. They built a Tin Hau temple around 1352 and the fortified village around 1724.

Nga Tsin Wai was the head village of the "Kowloon League of Seven", an inter-village union formed to guard against attacks from the pirates and bandits. Other villages of the League included the nearby Sha Po, Ta Kwu Leng, Shek Kwu Lung, Kak Hang, Tai Hom, Nga Tsin Long, Ma Tau Chung and Ma Tau Wai. The Tin Hau Temple of Nga Tsin Wai Tsuen was the place of worship for the residents of the villages of the League.

== Features ==
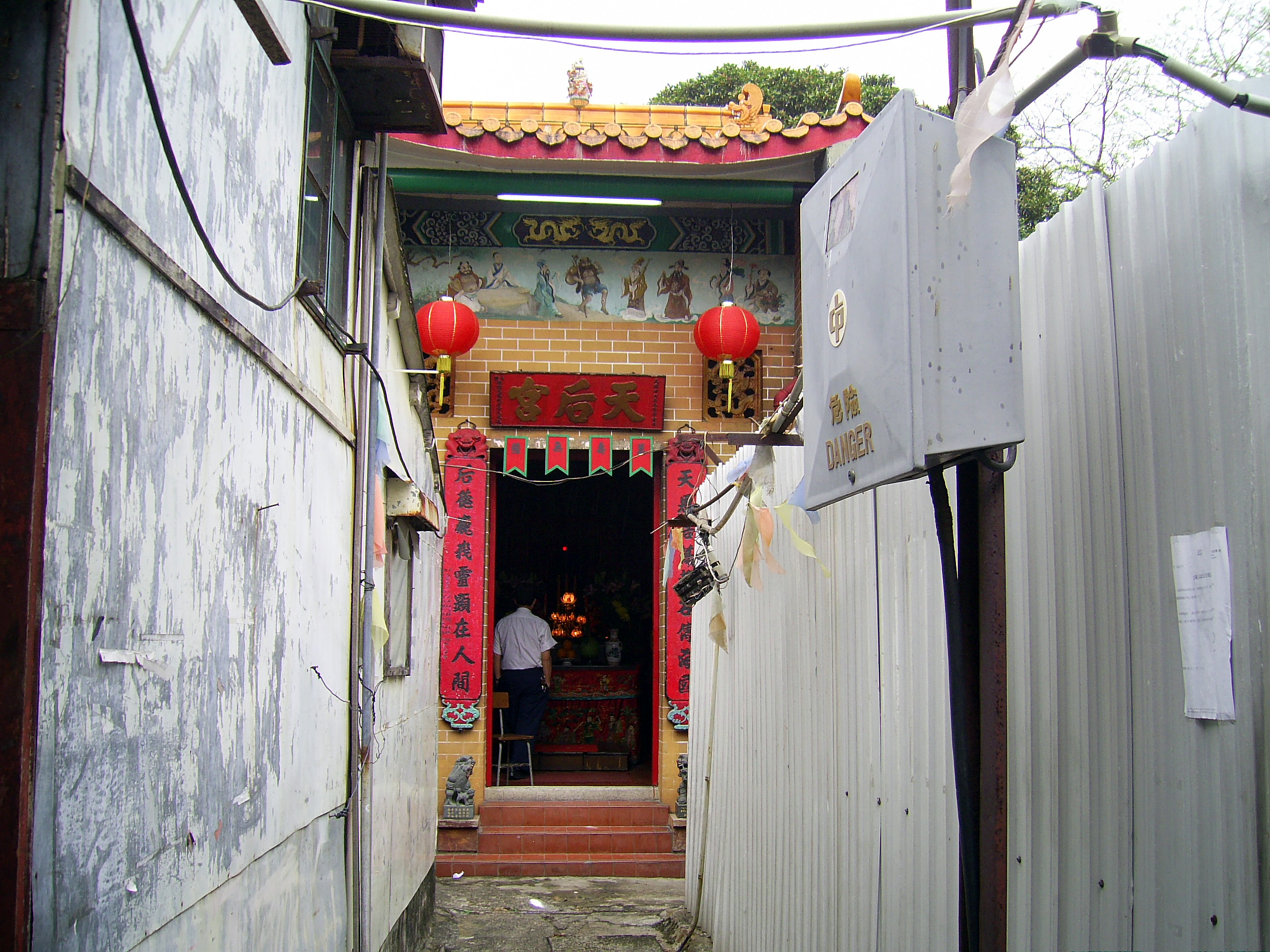
Tin Hau Temple in Nga Tsin Wai Tsuen in March 2009.

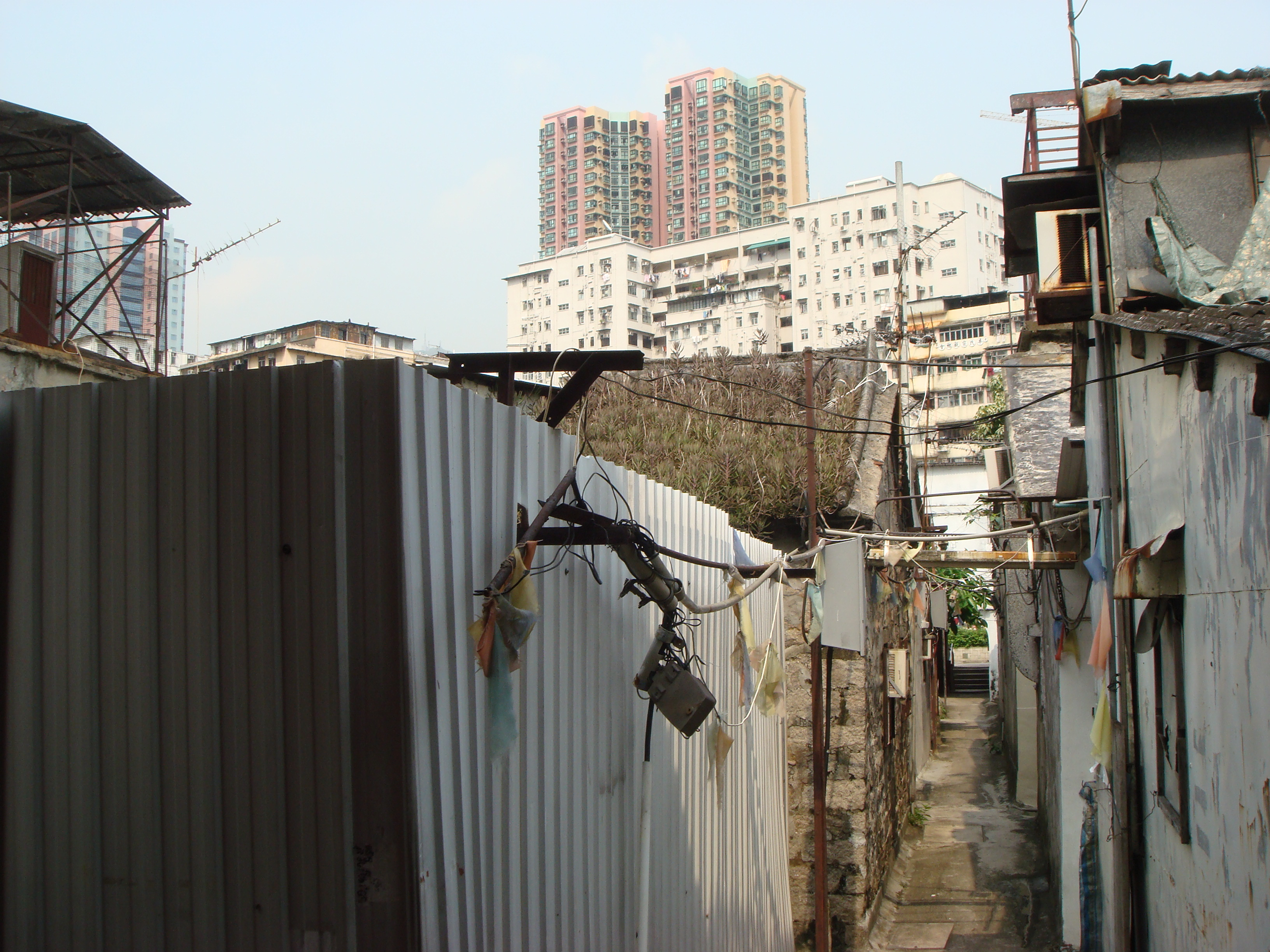
Central axis of the walled village in 2009, looking towards the entrance gate.

The village occupied an area of approximately 0.4 hectares. There are about 100 village houses separated by three narrow streets and six side lanes in a rectangular layout. The walled village has a Ng (吳) Clan Hall and a Tin Hau Temple.

== Resumption ==
On 18 July 2007, the government announced its plans to redevelop Nga Tsin Wai Tsuen. In response, the Nga Tsin Wai Village Concern Group was formed and documented conservation efforts on their website.

The Urban Renewal Authority (URA), a statutory agency, planned to replace the village with two high-rise towers. Villagers complained that the URA asked them to leave without finding them public housing flats and new homes for their businesses. The villagers also complained that the URA's offer for reduced shop rent following the redevelopment would only last for three years, and rents would subsequently revert to market rates, putting grassroots entrepreneurs (who had previously owned their own shops) out of business. By December 2015, only 15 families remained in the village.

The last residents were forced out of the village in late January 2016 under threat of a fine of up to HK$1 million and imprisonment of six months for not complying with the removal order. Villagers attacked the URA for putting profit ahead of heritage. They said that private developers had been eyeing the village for three decades, and only succeeded when the URA stepped in and made use of the Land Resumption Ordinance and Land (Miscellaneous Provisions) Regulations. The last two holdouts announced on 25 January that they would leave. They were Kwok Yue-ka, salon owner, and an elderly business owner named Lee who said he did not want to risk the safety of those who stayed to support him.

The URA partnered with Cheung Kong Property Holdings to redevelop the site. The village will be replaced with two towers housing 750 flats, plus "some conservation elements", resulting from archaeological finds in 2018, are to be featured.

== Conservation ==
The Entrance Gate, the Ng Ancestral Hall and the Tin Hau Temple have been listed as Grade III historic buildings since March 2014.

== See also ==
- Walled villages of Hong Kong
- Wong Chuk Yeung (Tai Po District)
- Urban village (China)
