= Stone House (Diamond Hill) =

Structure from the Tai Hom squatter village in Hong Kong

Coordinates: 22.339577°N 114.200188°E

- 石寓
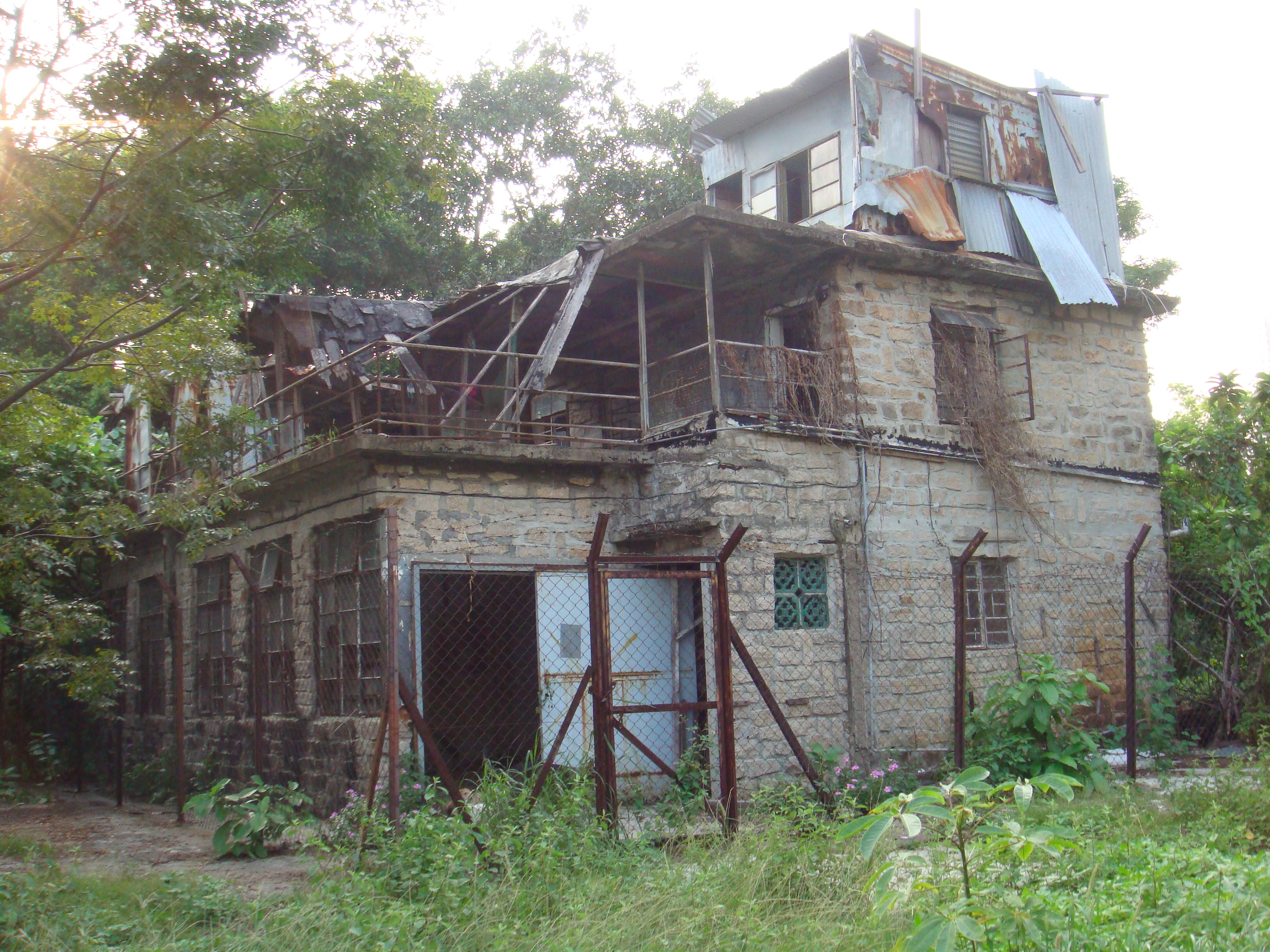
- The Stone House in October 2009.
- Interactive map of the Stone House area

General information
- Classification: Grade III historic building (2001-2010), No Grading (2010-)
- Location: Tai Hom, Kowloon, No. 4 Tai Koon Yuen, Hong Kong
- Completed: late 1940s

Technical details
- Material: Granite

Stone House
- Traditional Chinese: 石寓
Transcriptions
Yue: Cantonese
- Yale Romanization: Sehk yuh
- Jyutping: Sek6 jyu6

The Stone House is one of the three 'Treasures of Tai Hom Village' (大磡村三寶), the three remaining structures from the former Tai Hom squatter village demolished in 2001. The building is located at No. 4 Tai Koon Yuen (大觀園), Tai Hom, in the Wong Tai Sin District of Kowloon, Hong Kong, China. In 2002, Hong Kong's Antiquities Advisory Board recognized Stone House as a Grade III historic building. It was subsequently downgraded to "No Grading" in 2010. In 17 July 2015 the government approved plans to build Public Housing Estates and Home Ownership estates on the site of Tai Hom, while also including a water park to relocate the three structures. The park remains in construction in 2024.

== History ==
The Stone House was built in the late 1940s. It was built of granite from the Diamond Hill Stone Quarry, and was a typical structure within the area.

In 1947, land was bought by Yang Shou-ren (楊守仁), who named it Tai Koon Yuen based on a mansion in one of China's four great classical novels, Dream of the Red Chamber. Several film studios were subsequently set up in Tai Hom, such as Dai Guan Film Production Factory, and Jian Cheng Film Production Factory. Some businessmen then set up two–storied stone houses, providing residence for artists and film makers. The Stone House was owned by Wu Jun-zhao (吳君肇), ex-manager of the former Shanghai Bank of Communications, who rented it to the actor Roy Chiao between the 1950s and 1960s. The house at 5 Tai Koon Yuen, now demolished, was once the accommodation of film director Li Han-hsiang.

== Redevelopment ==
In March 2008, authorities proposed to build a depot for the Sha Tin to Central Link (SCL) on the site of Tai Hom village, threatening the Three Treasures of Tai Hom Village.

On 6 September 2009, Oriental Daily, the best-selling Chinese-language daily in Hong Kong published a story explained that the government proposed to downgrade the building to "nil grade" classification. The newspaper article suggested that the proposed new classification may be aimed at easing construction of the SCL. The "nil grade" classification was confirmed on August 31, 2010.

In April 2013, expansion and modifications to the Diamond Hill station and SCL depot was commenced. Two out of the Three Treasures of Tai Hom Village: the Former RAF Hangar, and the Old Pillbox had to be removed. Only the Stone House remains untouched.

As early as 2015, a water garden/park adjacent to public housing estates in Tai Hom was proposed to relocate the three structures. Plans were made in 2017, and revised in 2020. Construction started in late 2020, with aims to finish the project in 2023 and 2024.
