= Hollywood Hong Kong =

2001 Hong Kong film by Fruit Chan

- Theatrical release poster
- Directed by: Fruit Chan
- Screenplay by: Lam Kee-To
- Produced by: Sylvain Bursztejn; Kei Haruna; Kumi Kobata
- Starring: Zhou Xun; Glen Chin
- Cinematography: O Sing-Pui
- Edited by: Fruit Chan
- Music by: Carlton Chu Hing Cheung; Lam Wah-Chuen
- Production companies: Capitol Films; Golden Network Asia Ltd. Hakuhodo; Media Suits; Movement Pictures; Nicetop Independent Ltd.
- Distributed by: Media Suits; Prorom Media-Trade
- Release dates: 2 September 2001 (Venice); 11 July 2002 (Hong Kong)
- Running time: 102 minutes
- Country: Hong Kong
- Language: Cantonese
- Box office: HK$34,241

Hollywood Hong Kong (Chinese: 香港有個荷里活; Jyutping: hoeng1 gong2 jau5 go3 ho4 lei5 wut6) is a 2001 Hong Kong film directed by Fruit Chan, with screenplay written by Lam Kee-To. The film was selected to compete for the Golden Lion at the 58th Venice International Film Festival. It is the second installment of his "Prostitute trilogy" which Chan directed from 2000–18. The other two movies in the trilogy are Durian Durian (2000) and Three Husbands (2018).

Chan is known for his disassociation with the mainstream Chinese cinema, and this film continues that legacy with the use of little-known actors (except for Zhou Xun) and dark humour.

== Plot ==
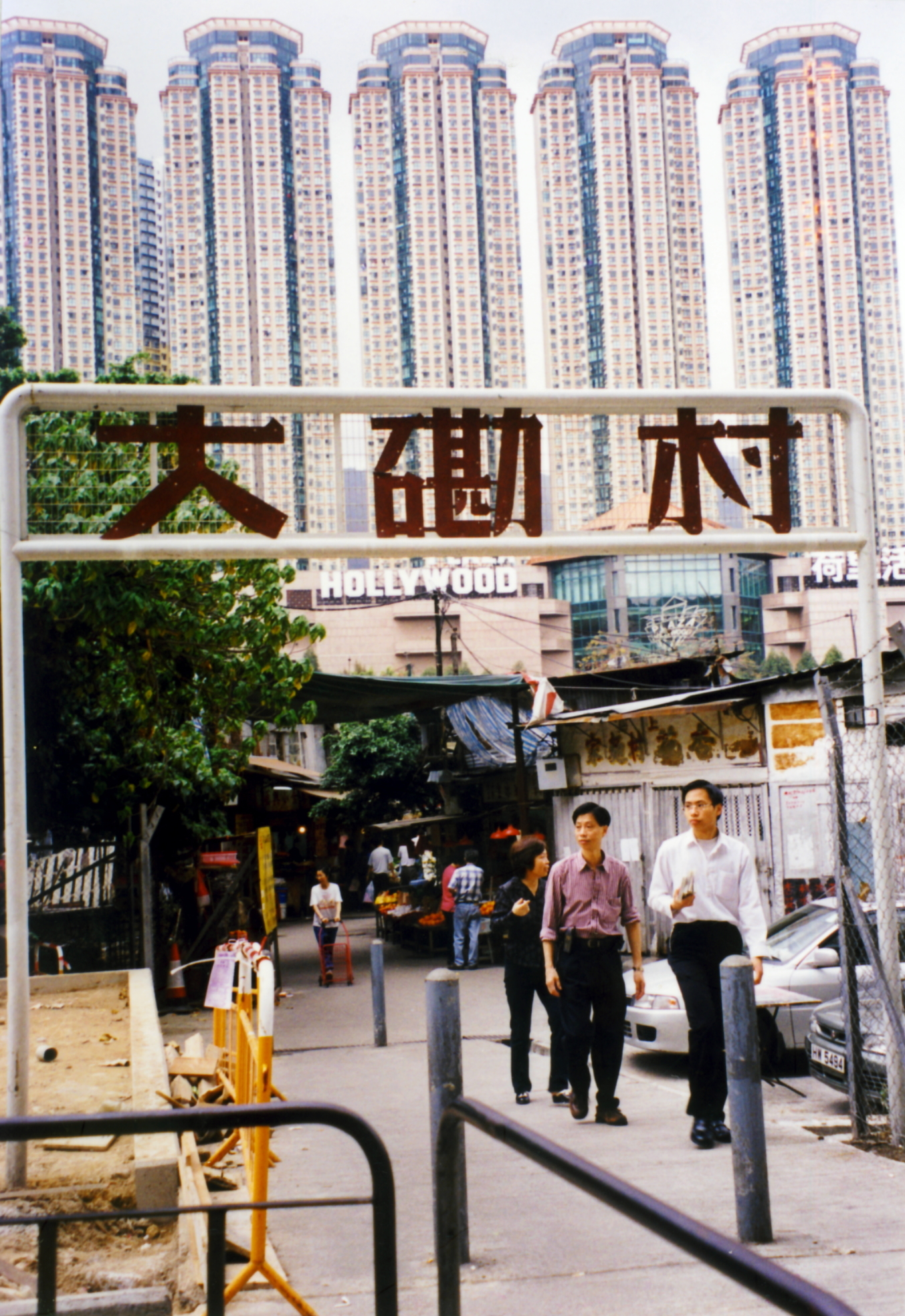
Former gate of Tai Hom Village in 1999, with Plaza Hollywood shopping centre and the Galaxia housing estate in the background.

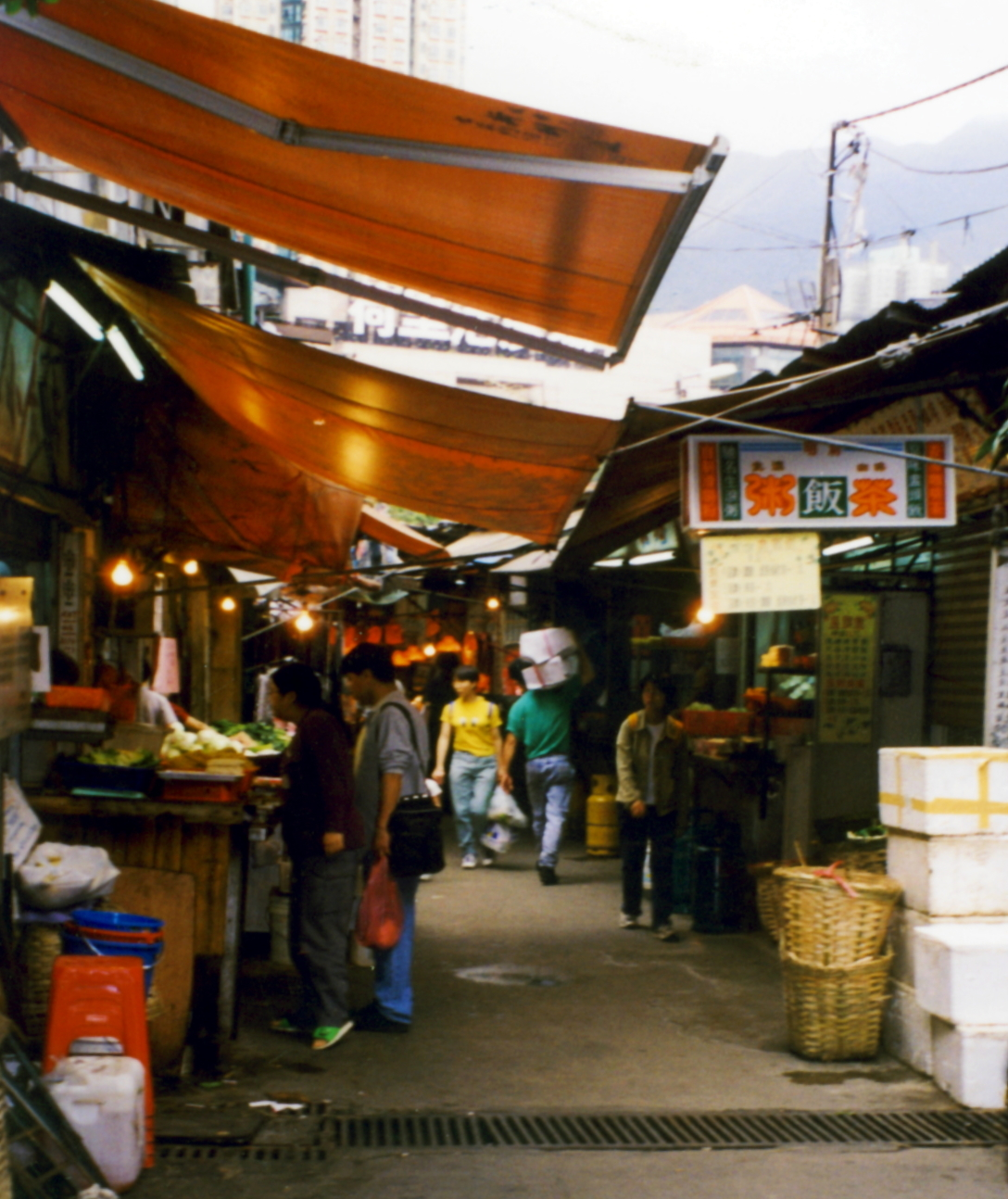
Tai Hom Village in 1999

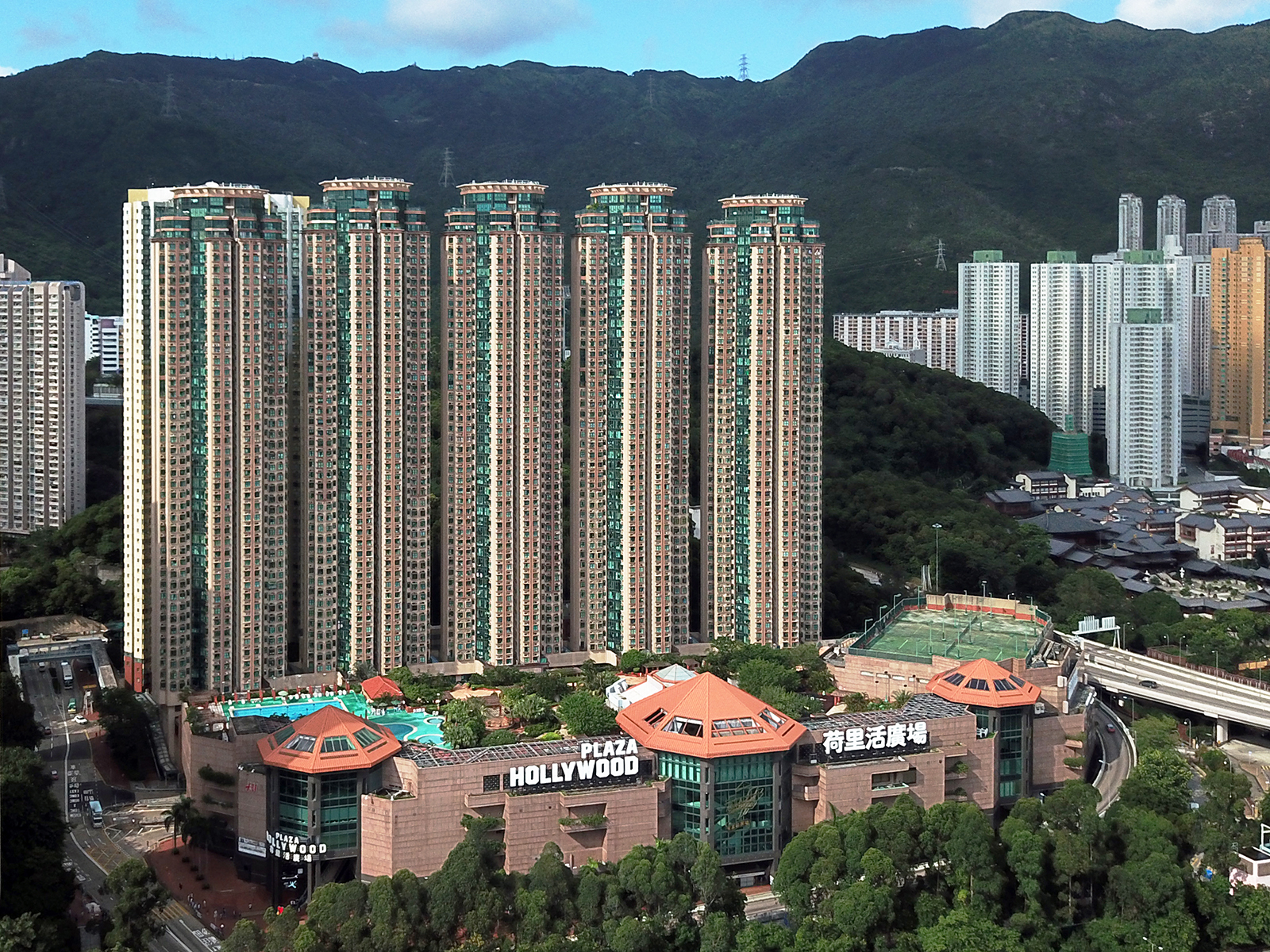
Plaza Hollywood shopping centre and the Galaxia housing estate in 2018, seen from above the former location of Tai Hom Village.

The story takes place in Tai Hom Village, a small Hong Kong shantytown that is literally and figuratively overshadowed by a large apartment and mall complex called Plaza Hollywood. The movie begins with pig butcher, Mr. Chu (Glen Chin) and his sons, Tiny (Leung Sze Ping) and Ming (Ho Sai Man) who are all obese. Keung (Won You Nam), also a resident of the town, is preoccupied with internet porn which leads him to meet Mainland Chinese prostitute Hung Hung (Zhou Xun), who advertises her services online and whom he pays for a night of torrid sex in the bushes outside Plaza Hollywood.

Hung Hung slowly infiltrates the lives of the town's characters, befriending Chu's family, especially Tiny. She goes by the alternative name of Tong Tong. At first, Tong Tong seems a refreshing, welcoming presence in the depressing, mundane life of Chu's family. Nevertheless, after Tong Tong seduces Ming for sex, the light, almost happy dynamic of the movie begins to shift and Tong Tong's "sweet innocence" is replaced by an opportunistic bitterness.

Tong Tong disappears from the town and sends letters to Ming and Keung claiming statutory rape as she is allegedly under sixteen. She extorts them for money to avoid legal repercussions and jail. When Keung refuses payment he is chased down by gangsters and his hand hacked off and flung far away. In a sick twist of black humour, Tiny finds what he believes to be Keung's hand and a quack doctor re-attaches it, only to find that it is the wrong hand. Angered, Keung joins Ming and with machetes they run to Plaza Hollywood to track down Tong Tong. But by the time Tong Tong is long gone. In a fit of despair Keung commands Ming to cut his wrongly attached hand off. In the end no one's story ends happily. Tong Tong however allegedly makes her way to the real Hollywood.

== Cast ==
- Zhou Xun as Hung Hung/Tong Tong
- Glen Chin as Mr. Chu
- Wong You Nam as Wong Chi-Keung
- Leung Sze Ping as Tiny Chu
- Ho Sai Man as Ming
- Tsang Tsou Choi as Calligrapher

== Release ==
Hollywood Hong Kong was released in eleven countries including Italy, South Korea, Japan, Hungary, Israel, the US, the Netherlands, Singapore, the Philippines, Norway, and Finland.

== Criticism ==
Most critics who praised Chan's earlier works have split opinions on Hollywood Hong Kong. Kenneth Brorroson of "Hong Kong DVD and Movie" believes it to be a well-done movie with more profound themes and more interesting twists than most mainstream Hong Kong movies. There are also standout performances by Zhou Xun and the young Leung Sze Ping. Online critic Brandon Fincher agrees that the film's delivery and the movement from light to dark comedy add to its appeals. Each character's development and the way each reminds us of ourselves makes the movie a success Kozo from LoveHKfilm.com also approves of the film. He cites its dark, absurd yet funny portrayal of seemingly normal individuals living "normal" life, and concludes that the Chan's engagements and sympathies make the movie "decidedly iconoclastic".

Reviewers at cityweekend.com.cn are less enamoured with the film. While most find the dark elements and the contrasts intriguing, they claim the film lacks charm.

== Awards ==
Hollywood Hong Kong was nominated nineteen times and won six awards from international film festivals. These include: the Cinemanila International Film Festival, the Taiwan's 39th Golden Horse Awards, the 22nd Hong Kong Film Awards, the Hong Kong Film Critics Society Awards, the Singapore International Film Festival, and the Venice Film Festival.

The film won Best Director award at the Cinemanila Film Festival. It won Best Costume Design and Make-up, Best Director, and Best Sound Effects at the Golden Horse Film Festival. Hollywood Hong Kong won best screenplay at the Hong Kong Film Critics Society Awards.
