= Wong Chuk Yeung (Tai Po District) =

Village in Hong Kong

Coordinates: 22°24′19″N 114°15′57″E

One of the last remaining villagers in 2006.

Wong Chuk Yeung (Chinese: 黃竹洋) is a remote village in Tai Po District, on the Sai Kung Peninsula of Hong Kong. It is located within the Ma On Shan Country Park, southeast of Ma On Shan Peak.

== Administration ==
Wong Chuk Yeung is a recognized village under the New Territories Small House Policy.

== History ==
The village was established by the Lees (李) in 1660, who were originally from Dongguan, in Guangdong Province. Before they came to the village, they went to Kowloon City during the Southern Song dynasty (1127–1279) with the Ng (吳) and Chan (陳) clans and set up the Nga Tsin Wai Tsuen.

The villagers were farmers engaged in rice growing. They also produced sugar and beancurd sticks for sale in the Sai Kung Market.

At the time of the 1911 census, the population of Wong Chuk Yeung was 83. The number of males was 25.

Military facilities are located in the vicinity of Wong Chuk Yeung. They are believed to have been built by the Japanese during World War II in order to check the movements of Communist guerrillas, who were active in the nearby Sai Kung area. The systems comprise at least 13 pillboxes. Some of the village houses were occupied by the Japanese during the Japanese occupation of Hong Kong and the villagers were forced to build the road leading to Sai Kung and batteries on the hills.

In the 1950s, iron mines were opened in Ma On Shan. As a consequence, the water tables of the village were lowered and the land became unsuitable for cultivation, forcing many farmers to abandon their land. Twelve families also surnamed Lee were resettled by the government from Ping Chau to a site near the village with the provision of water supply for their daily use and irrigation.

== The village today ==
The village is abandoned but is regularly visited by its ancestral descendants at times of ancestral worship such as at Qingming Festival. It lies along the MacLehose Trail (stage 4) and is one of the few abandoned villages in Hong Kong still accessible by car. The village is currently in the middle of a takeover bid from a development company.
