= Plaza Hollywood =

Shopping centre in Diamond Hill, Hong Kong

Coordinates: 22.34071°N 114.20206°E

荷里活廣場 Plaza Hollywood

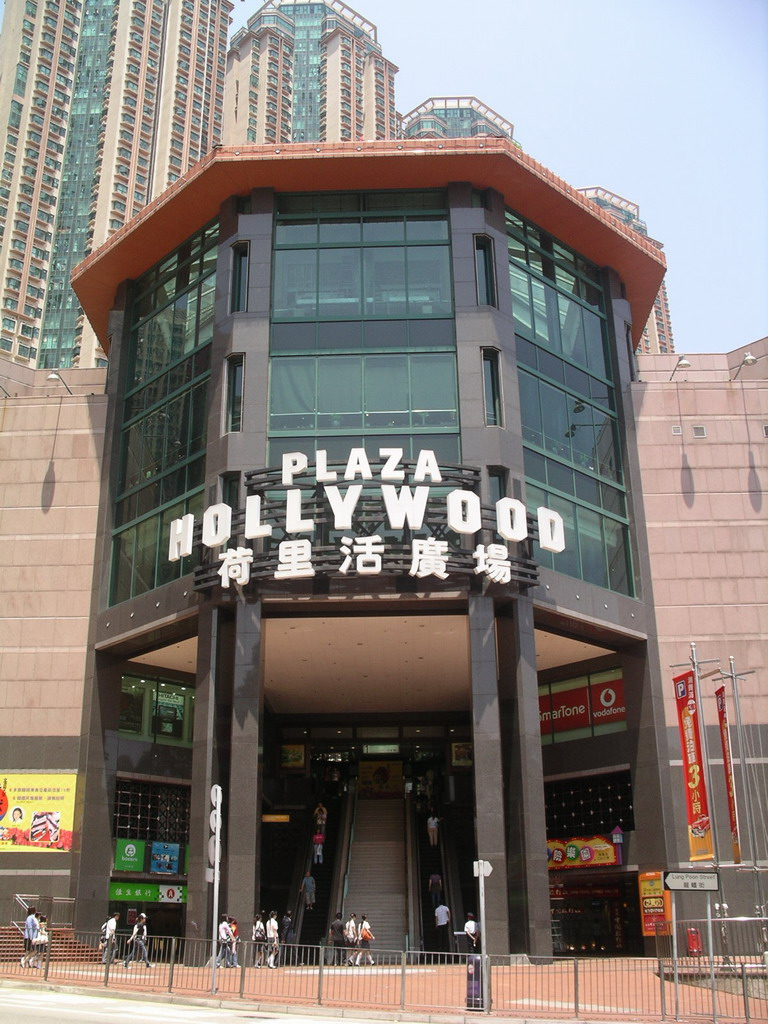

Plaza Hollywood
- Traditional Chinese: 荷里活廣場
- Simplified Chinese: 荷里活广场
Transcriptions
Standard Mandarin
- Hanyu Pinyin: Hélǐhuó Guǎngchǎng
Yue: Cantonese
- Jyutping: ho4 lei5 wut6 gwong2 coeng4

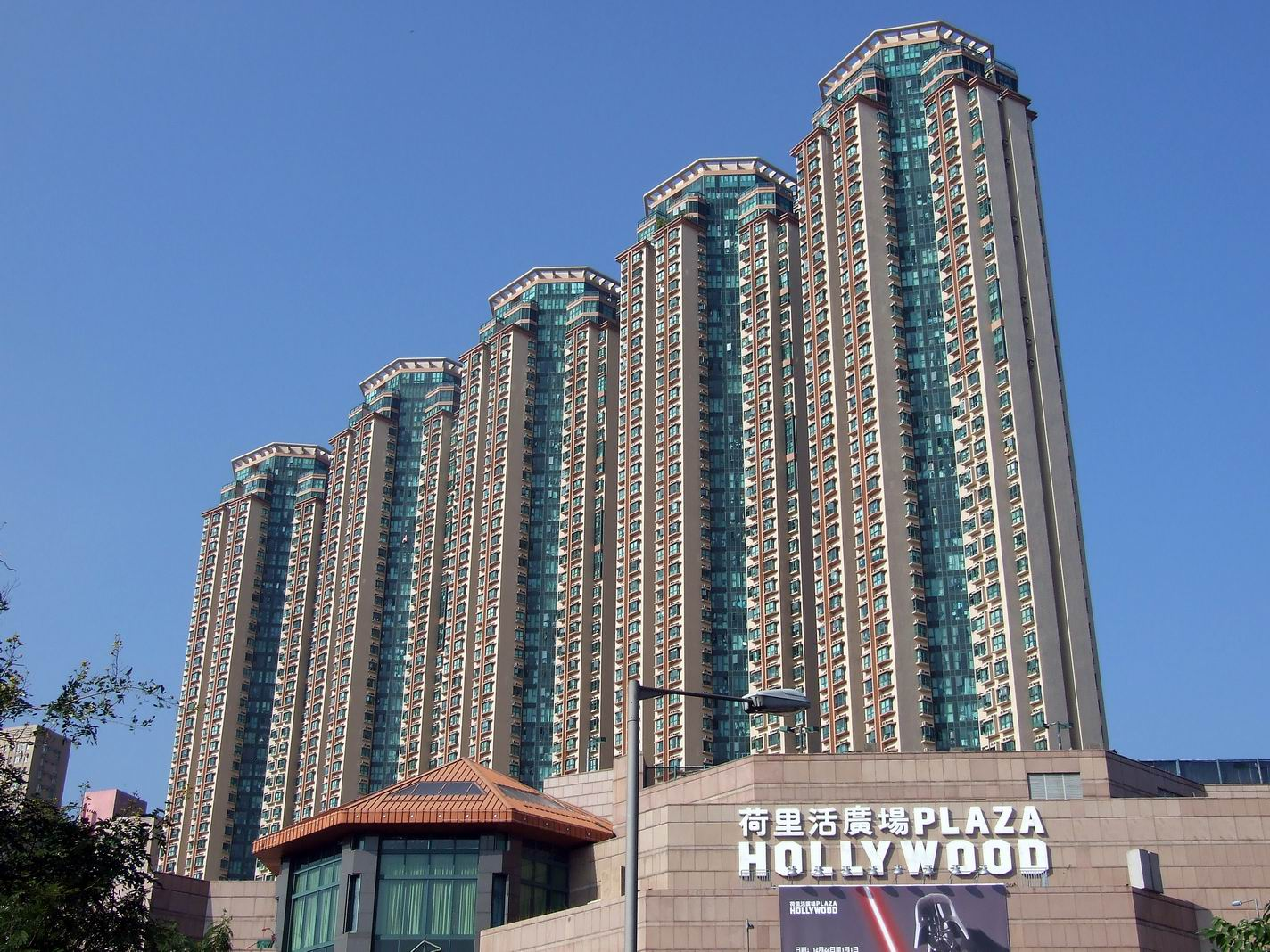
Plaza Hollywood and Galaxia housing estate.

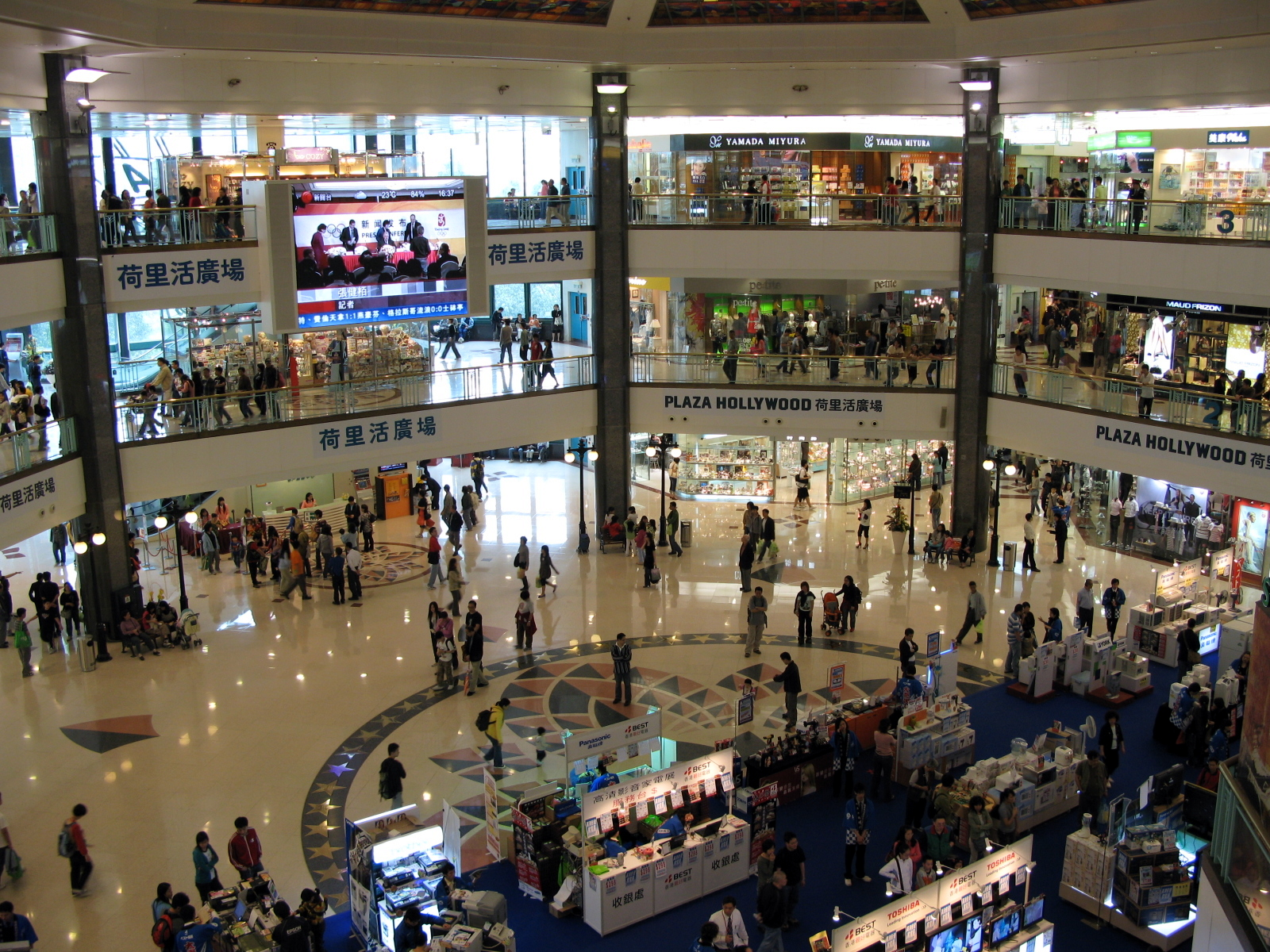
Atrium of Plaza Hollywood

Plaza Hollywood (Chinese: 荷里活廣場; Jyutping: ho4 lei5 wut6 gwong2 coeng4) is a large shopping centre in Diamond Hill, Kowloon, Hong Kong. It is part of Galaxia, a residential estate of Wharf Holdings.

The shopping centre opened in 1997, and includes four levels surrounding a central atrium. It has more than 220 shops, a large supermarket, food court, restaurants and cinema. It is themed after Hollywood in the United States.

== Location and history ==
The shopping centre was formerly located in the Tai Hom Village squatter areas; it began to develop into a residential and shopping centre after the demolition of the squatter area in the mid-1990s.

The centre is surrounded by Fung Tak Road, Lung Poon Street, Tai Hom Road, and Sheung Yuen Street. It is near Diamond Hill MTR station, and next to Lung Cheung Road, which is one of the main trunk roads in Hong Kong.

The complex was developed by Wharf (Holdings), Wheelock Properties, and Hongkong Realty and Trust.

== Architectural design ==
Inspired by the shopping mall concept in the United States, the centre aims to bring a colorful shopping experience to customers. Its large atrium "Star Plaza" is located in the center of the shopping centre, with a construction area near 10,000 square feet. This large scale is rare in other shopping centres found in Kowloon East.

Like the Avenue of Stars, the Stars Atrium on the first floor has the names of 60 Hong Kong celebrities who received awards from Hong Kong Film Awards set into star shapes floor tiles. The roof of the atrium is covered with brightly coloured polygon stained glass.

== Facilities ==
There is a public underground transport interchange, providing multiple bus and minibus routes between the major housing estates in Hong Kong and Wong Tai Sin district.

There are entrances and exits in Diamond Hill MTR station. There are also travel agencies with branches on the ground floor.

The main attraction of this shopping centre is the Stars Atrium. It is often home to many promotional features, including the 1 vs. 100 feature during the month of August in 2006. It also features a large LED screen.

Each level is connected by multiple sets of escalators. The fourth floor houses the sales office of the shopping centre, cinemas, and restaurants, all of which are independently connected via the elevator of third floor.

== Stores ==
Plaza Hollywood has boutiques everywhere, with multiple brands under i.t.'s.

Level 1 is where the large fashion apparel and jewelry stores are concentrated.

Level 2 is mainly for skin care, cosmetics, clothing, home appliances and telecoms shops.

Level 3 has restaurants and children's clothing and household personal care stores.

There are over 30 restaurants, including Pizza Hut and Wing Wah. It also has over 100 clothing, electronics, and retail stores.

== Transport ==
Plaza Hollywood is served by:

- MTR Diamond Hill station (Exit C2)
- Bus
- GMB
- Taxis
- Car park spaces

== Incidents ==
At 5 p.m. on 2 June 2023, two women thought to be a couple, Fong Hiu-tung (Chinese: 方曉彤, aged 26) and Lau Kai-hei (Chinese: 劉繼禧, aged 22), were stabbed by Szeto Sing-kwong (Chinese: 司徒成光), a 39-year-old man with a history of mental illness. The perpetrator was arrested and charged with two counts of murder.

== See also ==
- Hollywood Hong Kong, a 2001 Hong Kong film directed by Fruit Chan, is set in Tai Hom Village, and makes references to Plaza Hollywood.
- Wong Tung & Partners
