= Tai Hom Village =

Coordinates: 22.339428°N 114.200733°E

Tai Hom Village 大磡村
- Village
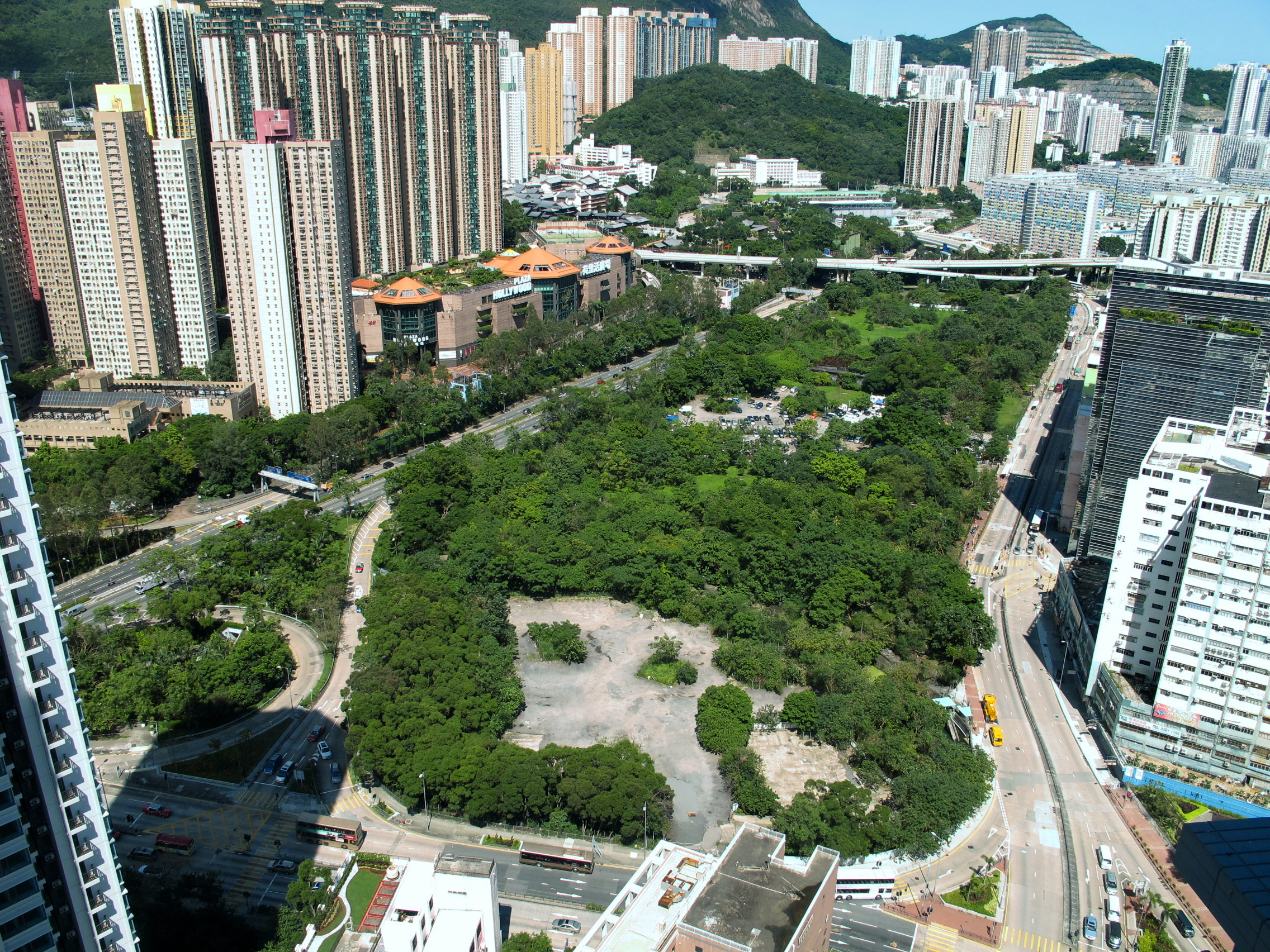
- Tai Hom Village Site
- Interactive map of Tai Hom Village
- Country: Hong Kong
- Region: Kowloon
- District: Wong Tai Sin District
- Demolished: 2001

Tai Hom Village
- Chinese: 大磡村
- Hanyu Pinyin: Dàkàncūn
- Yale Romanization: Daai ham chyūn
- Jyutping: Daai^{3} ham^{3} cyun^{1}

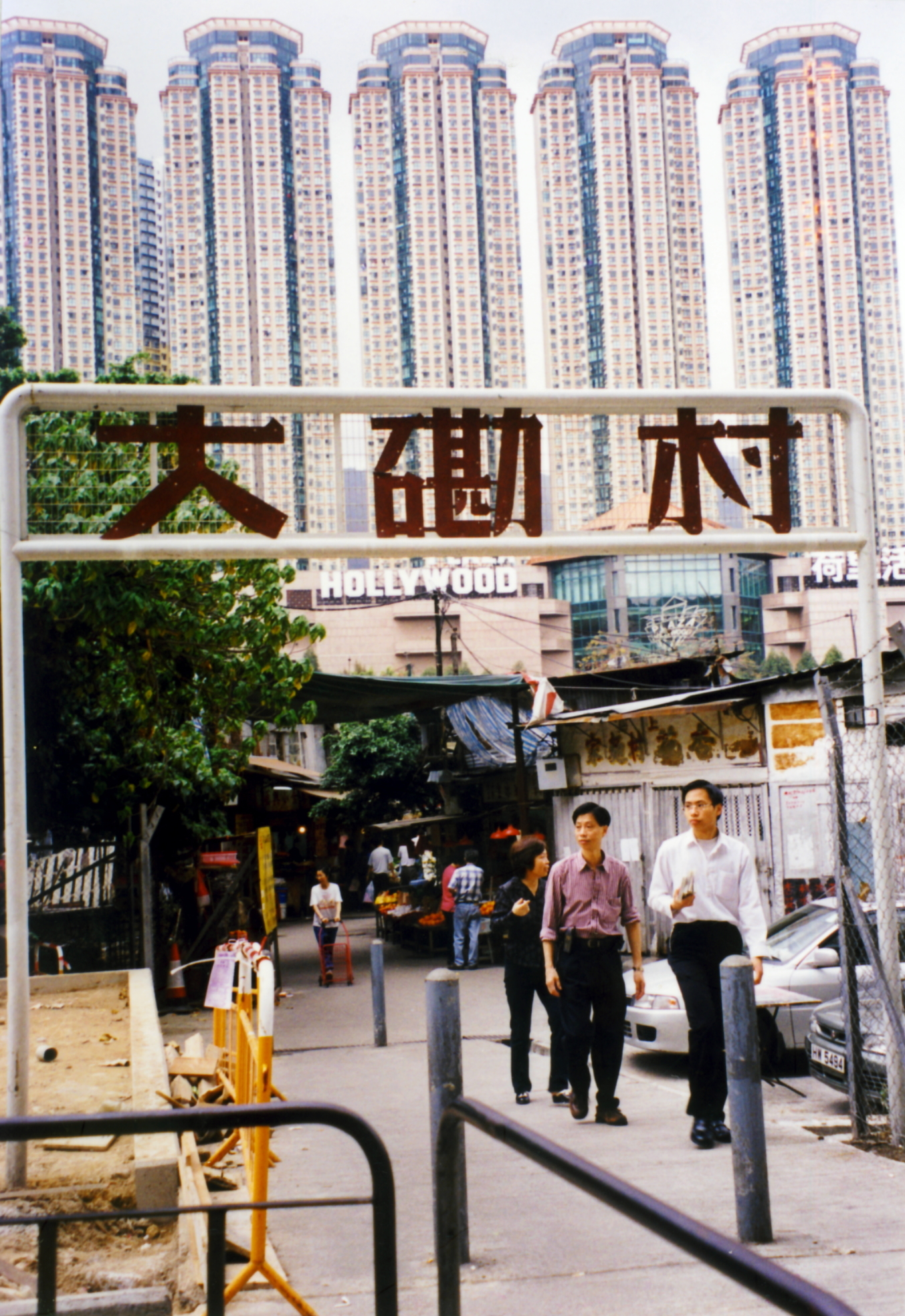
Former gate of Tai Hom Village in 1999, with Plaza Hollywood shopping centre and the Galaxia housing estate in the background.

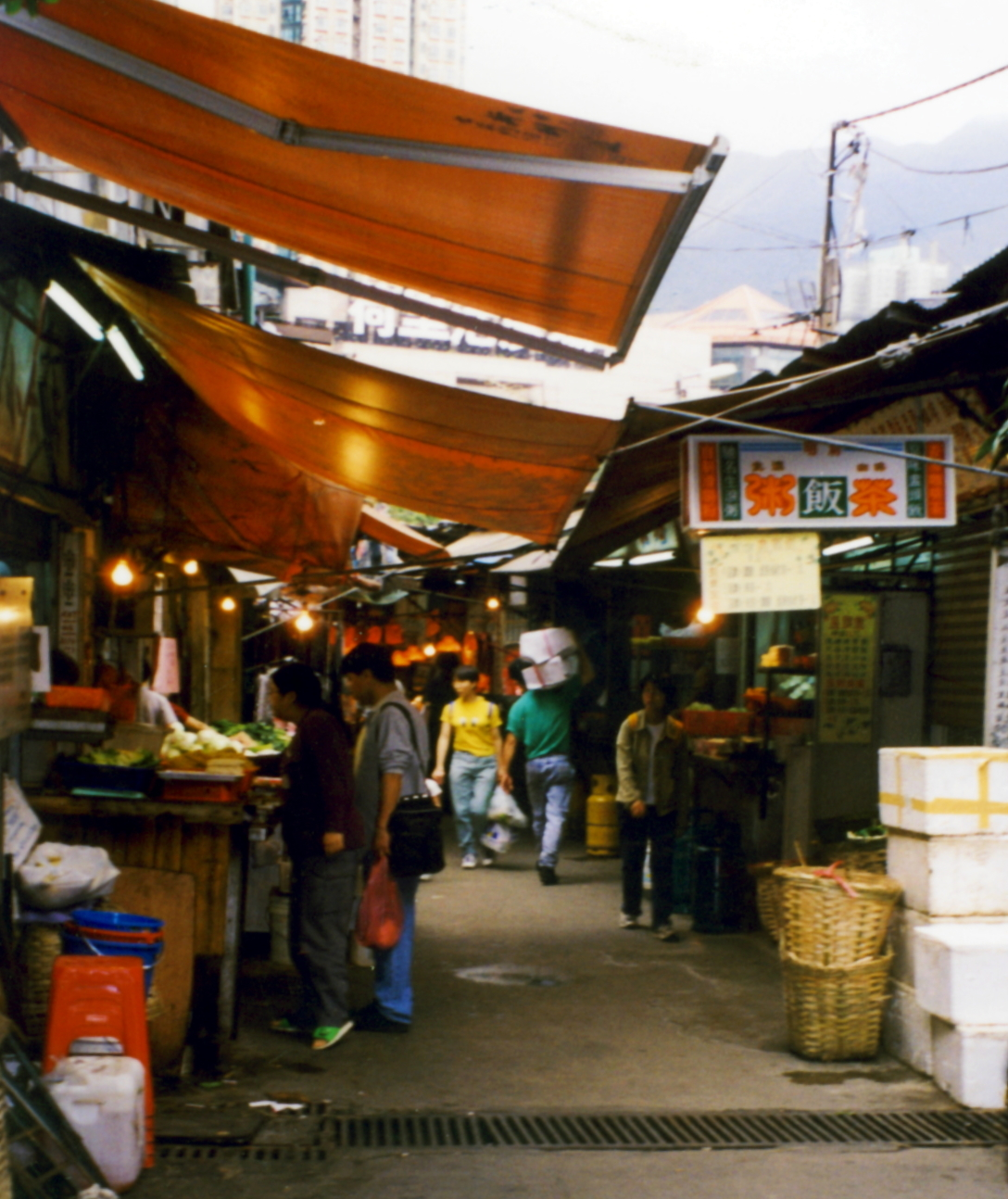
Shops in Tai Hom Village in 1999

Tai Hom Village (Chinese: 大磡村) was the largest squatter village in Kowloon, Hong Kong. Its demolition was completed in 2001, though a few historically significant structures were preserved. The name is still used to designate its former site in Wong Tai Sin District, which is awaiting redevelopment.

== Origin and history ==
The first villager on record was Chu Yan Fung (朱仁鳳), a Hakka person who began to live in the village around 1740. According to Siu Kwok Kin (蕭國健), a history professor in Chu Hai College of Higher Education, the pedigree book of the Zhu family recorded their immigration into the village in 1740; Tai Hom was the nickname of the village at that time – the district being officially named Fei Ngo Shan (飛蛾山). Chu Yan Fung purchased the land from the Qing government, and settled there. The district was famous for granite, a favourable building material at the time.

In 1936, the Hong Kong government attempted to reclaim the land rights to the district. The village became government land, except for 20% of privately owned land. In 1956, many immigrants from mainland China entered the village. Some of these were wealthy people from Shanghai. The area was popular among the upper-middle class until the 1960s.

During the Japanese occupation of Hong Kong in the 1940s, Tai Hom Village was demolished for the expansion of Kai Tak Airport, including the temple of the Chu family. The village was restored after the surrender of the Japanese, but the Chu family did not entirely restore their home. Only Chu Sam Tak (朱三德) remained in the village after the demolition, and the temple of the Chu family was not restored.

After the 1960s, due to government policy, an increase in population and the decline of the film industry, the village became home for more low-income people.

The modern Tai Hom Squatter Village was not located on the original site. It was located in Nga Yiu Tau Chuen (瓦窯頭村), part of which was the site of Kai Tak Airport during Japanese sovereignty.

== Living conditions of the village during its existence ==
=== Hygiene ===
According to the report by the Neighbourhood Advice-Action Council (NAAC) et al. in 1984 and 1985 the hygienic condition of Tai Hom Village was unfavourable. Major problems included accumulation of untreated garbage, stuffed drainage which caused floods, rat infestation, air pollution and aggregation of flies and mosquitoes.

In 2001, the villagers complained about the hygienic condition in Tuesday's Stores (星期二檔案), a TV news programme produced by the Television Broadcasts Limited (TVB). The programme particularly showed cockroaches and insects at a restaurant to pinpoint the undesirable circumstance.

Lam Kee-to, Jason further described the problem of rats in Hong Kong 101: 101 Reasons to Love and Hate Hong Kong. By his description, there were an excessive number of cats in the village, and the reason was rat infestation – cats accumulated to prey on the rats.

=== Amenities ===
Amenities covered include public toilets, recreational facilities, transportation, electricity and water supplies, education, fire prevention system and social order.

==== Public toilets ====
According to a report from the Student Press, the Students' Union of the Chinese University of Hong Kong, Tai Hom Village had no public toilet before 1999. The Tai Hom Village Kai-Fong Welfare Association had lodged requests for public toilets; it was evident in the bulletin of the association in 1961, 1973 and 1984 that multiple requisitions were presented.

==== Recreational facilities ====
In 1984, the report by NAAC also pointed out the lack of recreational facilities and community activities. According to government documents, there was a lounge near Tai Hom Village (Tai Hom Village South Temporary Sitting-out Area), but no other government recreational facilities has been discovered in our research so far.

NAAC did make suggestions to the government, including redeveloping the burnt area (due to fire hazard) into a recreational area. Whether the government responded to them remains unknown in our research.

==== Roads, road lamps and transportation ====
NAAC's report in 1984 pinpointed the problem of roads. At that time, they were rugged and scattered with rubbish, making them unfavourable for traffic. Road lamps were worn out and too few in number. Also, according to The Road to Tai Hom, there was no public transport until Leung King Chong, a villager, applied to provide public transport service.

==== Electricity supply ====
NAAC's report in 1984 pinpointed the problem of worn-out cables. Moreover, it specified the problem of stealing electricity, which Ms Elaine Chung, former deputy director (Strategy) of the Housing Department, also mentioned upon her retirement from the department, saying that the problem of electricity stealing slackened the setup of Tai Hom Village electricity supply.

==== Water supply ====
There were no independent water supplies at least before 1961. There were public pipes but not enough. The Tai Hom Village Kai-Fong Welfare Association lodged a request for independent water supply in 1984. In 1985, reports showed that wells were still one of the water supplies of the citizens.

==== Education ====
According to The Road to Tai Hom, religious organisations established schools in Tai Hom Village; villagers were most properly educated; the Kai-Fong Welfare Association even established concessionary education (義學) in 1961.

==== Fire ====
In the late 1970s, a fire patrol team was established. The fire patrol team was formed by villagers. In the beginning, they were in charge of both fire extinguishment and fire prevention, but government fire stations later became in charge of putting out fire. The fire patrol team would hold meetings to exchange approaches of fire prevention, and publish fire prevention guidelines for villagers. In 1983, the government responded to the team's request of setting up 20 fire hoses.

However, fire remained one of the most concerned hazards in Tai Hom Village. In a report in 1985, 80% of the surveyed showed anxiety at fire hazards. Before the final demolition of Tai Hom Village, 2 fires happened in one week.

==== Social order ====
Before 1961, the residents of Tai Hom Village self-governed the social order of their living area. Formed by villagers, Geng Nian Tuan (更練團) was claimed to deter crime and lower the number of late-night pedestrians in one of the bulletins of Kai-Fong Welfare Association. In 1973, the police took over Geng Nian Tuan, proclaiming that official power was better than civilian governance. However, the villagers still participated in the maintenance of social order. Kai-Fung Service Group (街坊服務團) was formed to assist the police and provide community services.

=== Economics ===
Before 1940, Tai Hom Village was a small village with one church, two schools, two temples (賓霞、志蓮淨院) and one hospital (東九龍分科醫院). Farms were everywhere. In 1940, Zhao Shushen (趙樹燊)'s Daguan Motion Pictures (大觀電影公司) entered the village, leading to the immigration of a lot of celebrities and high-income citizens. They built houses in Tai Hom Village to enjoy proximity to their places of work.

The film industry thrived in Tai Hom Village especially after Japanese rule over Hong Kong. Daguan Motion Pictures was altered into Hong Kong Pianchang (香港片廠), in 1954 Zhuanshi Pianchang (鑽石片場), in 1960 Jiancheng Zhipianchang (堅城製片廠). TV broadcast companies also rented the venues of the film companies. A lot of celebrities lived there including Chinese Opera actress Hong Xian-nu (紅線女), director Li Han-hsiang, artists Hui Goon Man and his brothers (許冠文兄弟), Bao Fang (鮑方), Roy Chiao, Nancy Sit, Andy Lau.

The film industry also stimulated the growth of other industries. There were shops for theatre props; Wing Lai,-yuen (詠黎園); a restaurant famous for its noodles also thrived in the village. The restaurant was established by Yang Dian-hu (楊殿湖), and was a favourite leisure place for filmmakers at that time. According to Chan Tin Keung (陳天權), Hong Kong columnist and playwright, the restaurant might be named by Li Han-hsiang: Wing (詠) meaning singing, Lai (黎) meaning grass, trees and flowers, the whole name celebrating the pastoral around the restaurant. According to the official website of the restaurant, its ancestors were the royal chef in the Qing dynasty.

Other industries also thrived; factories were established in the village.

In 1949, immigrants from mainland flooded into Hong Kong, and Tai Hom Village became home for higher-income immigrants (lower-income immigrants lived in Shek Kip Mei or Kowloon Tsai. They build stone houses for accommodation. Due to its propriety, the village was dubbed as "Small Kowloon Tong"(小九龍塘).

However, after 1960, the rapid increase in population crammed the village. Due to the government policy, the village gradually became home for more low-income people. The film companies in the village were demolished in the 1980s. The economy began to deteriorate.

Restaurants and stores still remained in existence before the final demolition, most of them on Sun Hing Road (新興路).

== Demolition of the village ==
On 25 August 1998, the Housing Department announced the demolition of Tai Hom Village, which was proposed to take place from 14 November 2000 to the end of December 2000 and divided into eight phases. Then, the vacant land would be used for Public Development, such as construction of a new "Environmental Public Housing Estate" to supply living areas for some 10,000 people. Reallocation of residents of the village was arranged by the government. Public housing renting quota was pre-assigned to 880 households for moving into Tsz Ching Estate in Tsz Wan Shan which was under construction at that time; 790 households were reallocated to Kwai Shing East Estate, Shek Lei Estate and Po Tin Estate; and the remaining residents chose to apply to join the subsidised Home Ownership Scheme.

Table 1: Policy Adopted by the Government for Reallocation of the Squatter Village Residents

| Type of Housing | Qualification(s) |
|---|---|
| Public Housing | (1) For residents who: were living in Squatter Village registered in 1982; and; registered in the Squatter Village census in year 1984–85; (2) For residents who had registered on the public housing waiting list, and passed the means and asset tests |
| Interim Housing | (1) For means-tested waiting list applicants registered in 1998 (2) For residents who had registered in 1998 but had not passed the means and asset tests (*They could only live in interim housing for one year) |
| Temporary Shelter | For residents who: did not register in 1998; and; were living in Squatter Village not registered in 1982 |
| Remarks | Residents who registered in 1998 could apply to join the Home Ownership Scheme (Green Form) or receive subsidies for private housing. |

There had been a lot of protests from the locals since the announcement of demolition of Tai Hom Village. The squatter residents requested "reallocation within the same district" and "relaxation of squatter census" from the government; however, the Housing Department refused their appeal and maintained its existing policy. The government took action on 13, 16 and 20 February and 2 March 2001, driving away the residents and dismantling the squatter village. In face of intense opposition from the residents, the Housing Department took such hard-line approaches as breaking doors or walls and cutting electricity to force people to leave.

== Heritage sites ==
There are currently three remaining historical structures in Tai Hom Village, namely the Stone House (石寓), the Former Royal Air Force Hangar (前皇家空軍飛機庫) and the Old Pillbox (機槍堡). They are dubbed ‘The Three Treasures of Tai Hom' (大磡三寶).

=== The former Royal Air Force Hangar ===
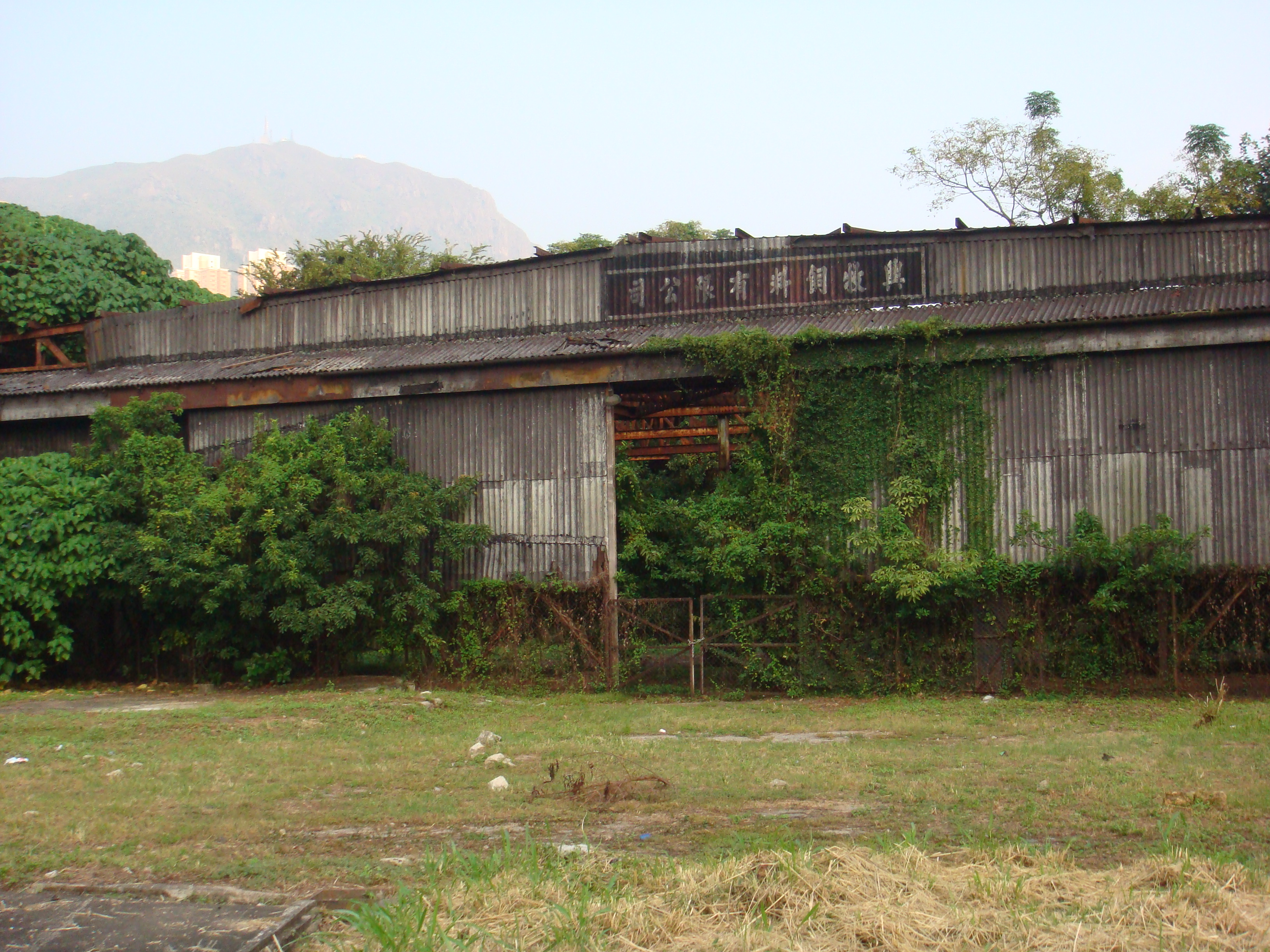
Former Royal Air Force Hangar

The Former Royal Air Force Hangar has been accorded a Grade III status by the Antiquities and Monuments Office. It was erected in 1934 at the Kai Tak Airport as a civilian aircraft hangar. However, it was later dismantled by the Japanese due to construction of a new runway at the airport. The hangar was re-erected at Tai Hom Village in 1943 by the Japanese Air Force; it was believed that the hangar's function was to house Japanese military aircraft, mainly Zero-Sen fighters, and appliances. It was also used as training grounds for the aircrew and technicians.

After World War II, the hangar was used by the English military, but was abandoned in the 1970s. It was then used by the government and various organisations. Examples of past uses include:

- Storage, packaging and distribution of relief commodities received from the United States by various relief agencies
- Packing of food parcels by the government's Urban Services Department together with the Cooperative For American Relief Everywhere, a relief organisation
- Production of animal foodstuff by private company Hing Muk Animal Foodstuff Company

The Former Royal Air Force Hangar is presently the only surviving pre-war military aircraft hangar in Hong Kong; it is also one of the few remains of the Kai Tak Airport in its early days.

=== Old pillbox ===
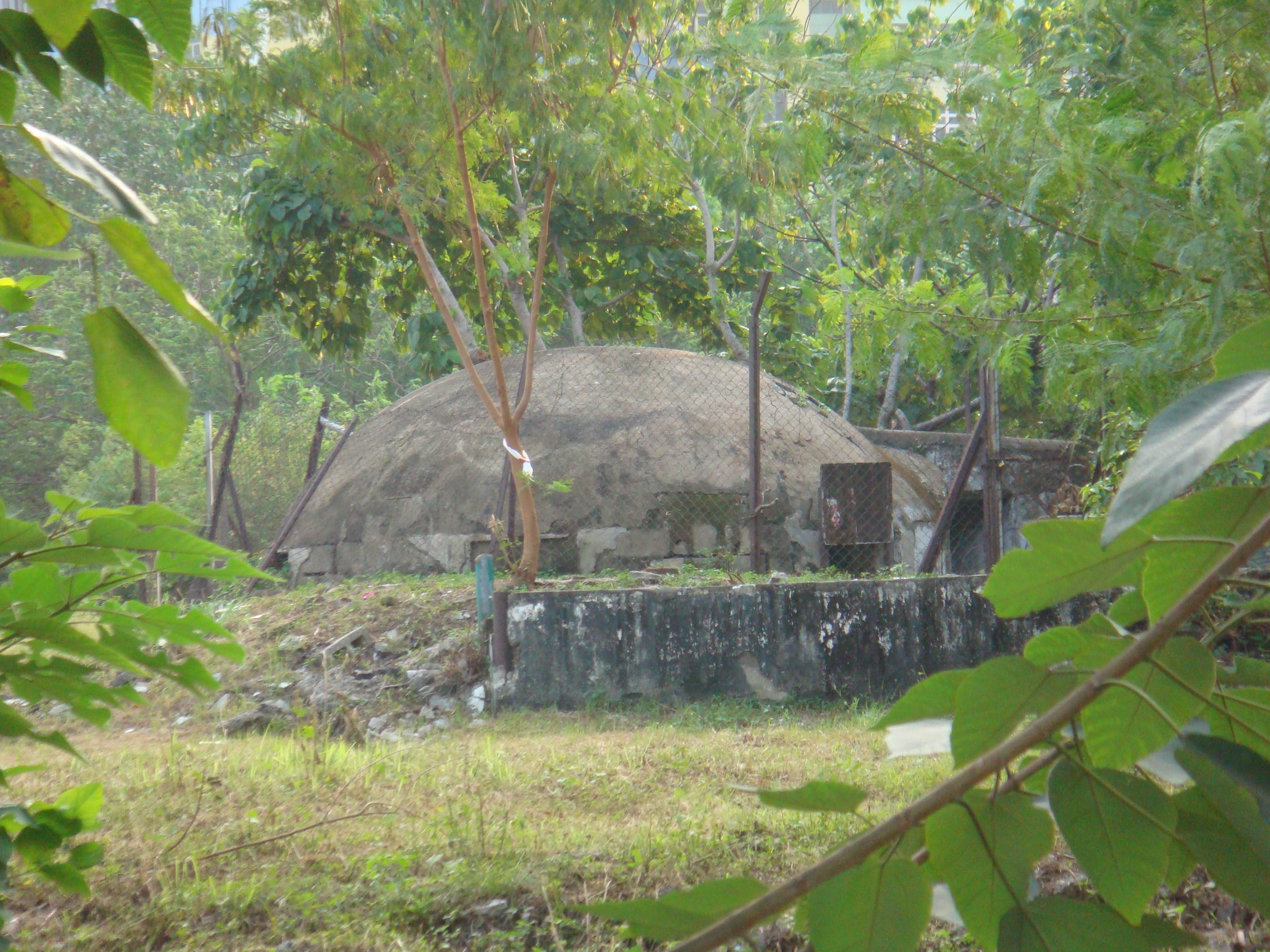
Old Pillbox

The Old Pillbox was constructed in the 1930s by the Royal Air Force; it was situated at a strategic nodal point of the former Royal Air Force Station at Kai Tak and roads connected to the Kai Tak Airport, bearing great significance as a defensive strongpoint at the time. During World War II, it was used as an air-raid shelter by the Japanese aircrew and technicians. It had been abandoned after the Japanese Occupation, and was later occupied by squatters. A cannon can still be found pointing towards Lei Yue Mun to defend against attacks by enemy planes. A Grade II status was accorded by the Antiquities Advisory Board.

=== Stone house ===
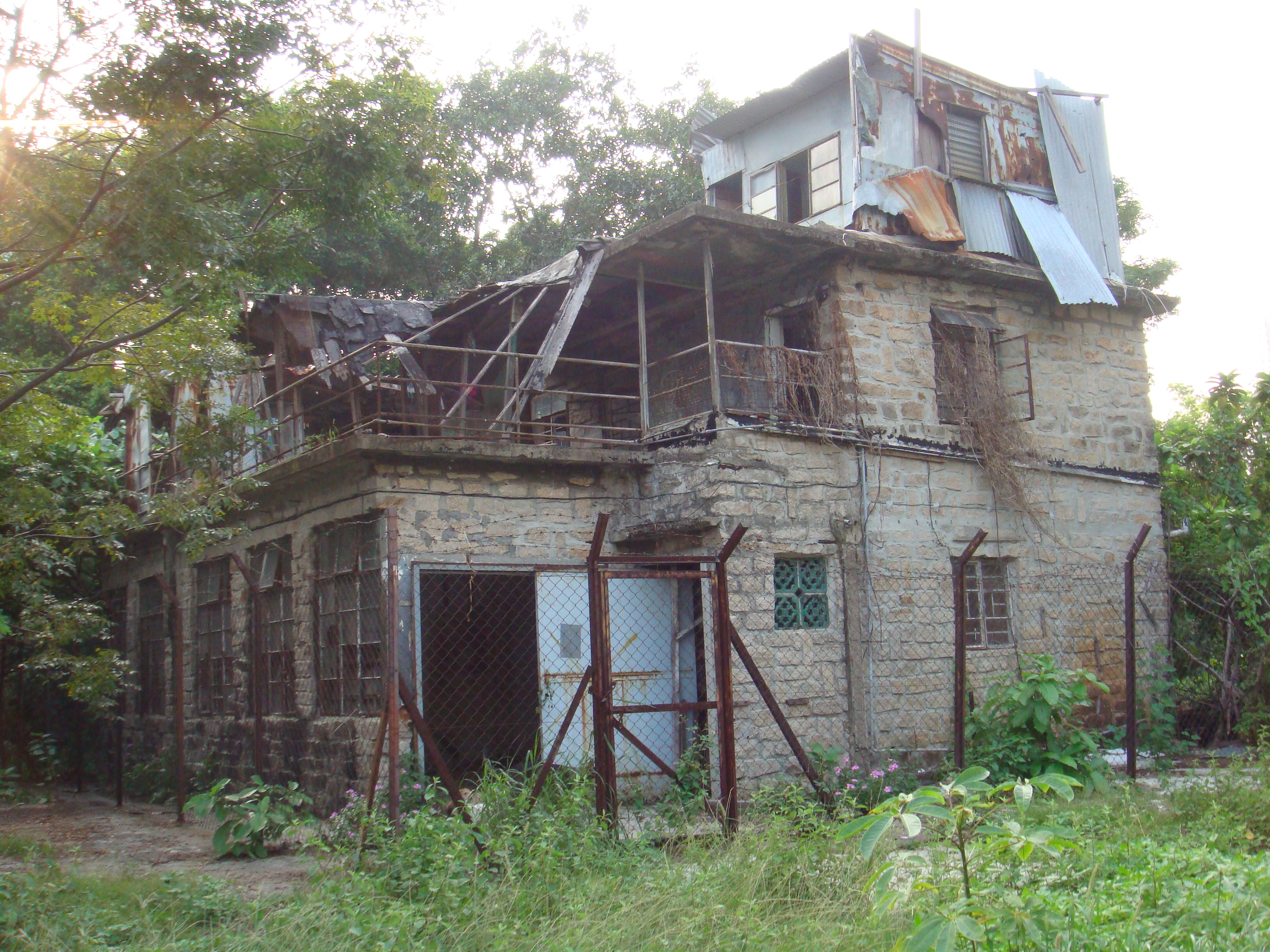
Stone House

The Stone House, located at Tai Koon Yuen, was built in the 1940s. The construction of the Stone House was based on one of China's four great classical novels, Dream of the Red Chamber. In 1947, land was bought by Yang Shou-ren, who named it Tai Koon Yuen; several film studios were subsequently set up in the area. Several businessmen then set up two–storied stone houses, providing residence for artists and film makers. It had once been occupied by Wu Jun-zhao, manager of the former Shanghai Bank of Communications, director Li Han-hsiang and actor Roy Chiao. The House was built of granite from the Diamond Hill Stone Quarry, and was a typical structure within the area. The Stone House was accorded Grade III status by the Antiquities Advisory Board.

=== Controversy over the future of the heritage sites ===
To accommodate the construction of the Sha Tin to Central Link (SCL) depot by the MTR Corporation Limited (MTRCL), the Planning Department had suggested moving the Former Royal Air Force Hangar and the Stone House subject to further research by the MTRCL. Several District Councilors are concerned that the Old Pillbox and the Stone House were downgraded to pave way for the MTRCL's clearance of the site to build the SCL depot. According to Wong Tai Sin District Councillor Lam Man-fai, the "grading of historic structures is to evaluate their cultural significance, and not just looking at several stone houses". Wallace Chang Ping-hung, a professor of architecture at the Chinese University of Hong Kong, claimed that the MTRCL's plan "amounts to raping the heritage".

According to the Planning Department's newest evaluation, the Old Pillbox will remain situated at its present location; however, it is estimated that the Sha Tin to Central Link Railway will occupy part of the location where the Hangar and Stone House are positioned. As both structures are in states of disrepair, it will be unfeasible to restore them after their disassembly. It is reported that the SCL Environmental impact assessment will further examine the technical feasibility of relocating the Hangar and Stone House, together with future uses of both structures. District Councillor Lam Man-fai suggested that it would be better if the future SCL depot could be constructed underground, so as to allow the three heritage sites to remain. It would also reduce noise, but the MTRCL claimed that this would increase time and money.

== Residential developments ==
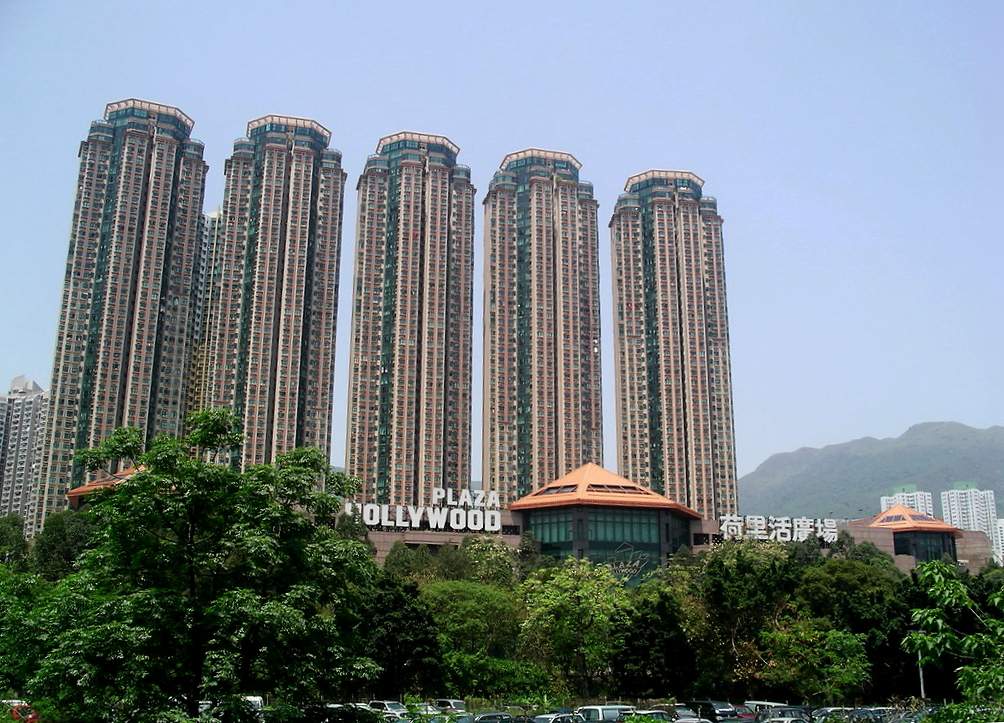
Galaxia and Plaza Hollywood

=== Public housing ===
In 1976, the Government released a zoning plan for 265 hectares, in which they projected to house some 219,000 in subsidised public housing by 1996. In 1984 plans for Home Ownership Scheme flats to house 15,600 people and Public Housing for a further 24,500 for the area were unveiled on a site of 81 hectares. At the time of the announcement, the squatter population was estimated at 35,000.

=== Galaxia ===
Galaxia (星河明居) is a private housing estate located at 3 Lung Poon Street, near the Diamond Hill station. Galaxia comprises five blocks (A–E). There are 46 floors in Block A and E and 47 floors in Block B, C and D, making a total of 1,684 units. Galaxia is connected to the Plaza Hollywood shopping centre. It was constructed in 1998, developed by Wheelock & Co., The Wharf (Holdings) Limited, New Asia Realty and Harriman Realty. In 2008, ISS Eastpoint took the place of Harriman Realty in the Galaxia consortium.

== Development plans for the former village site ==
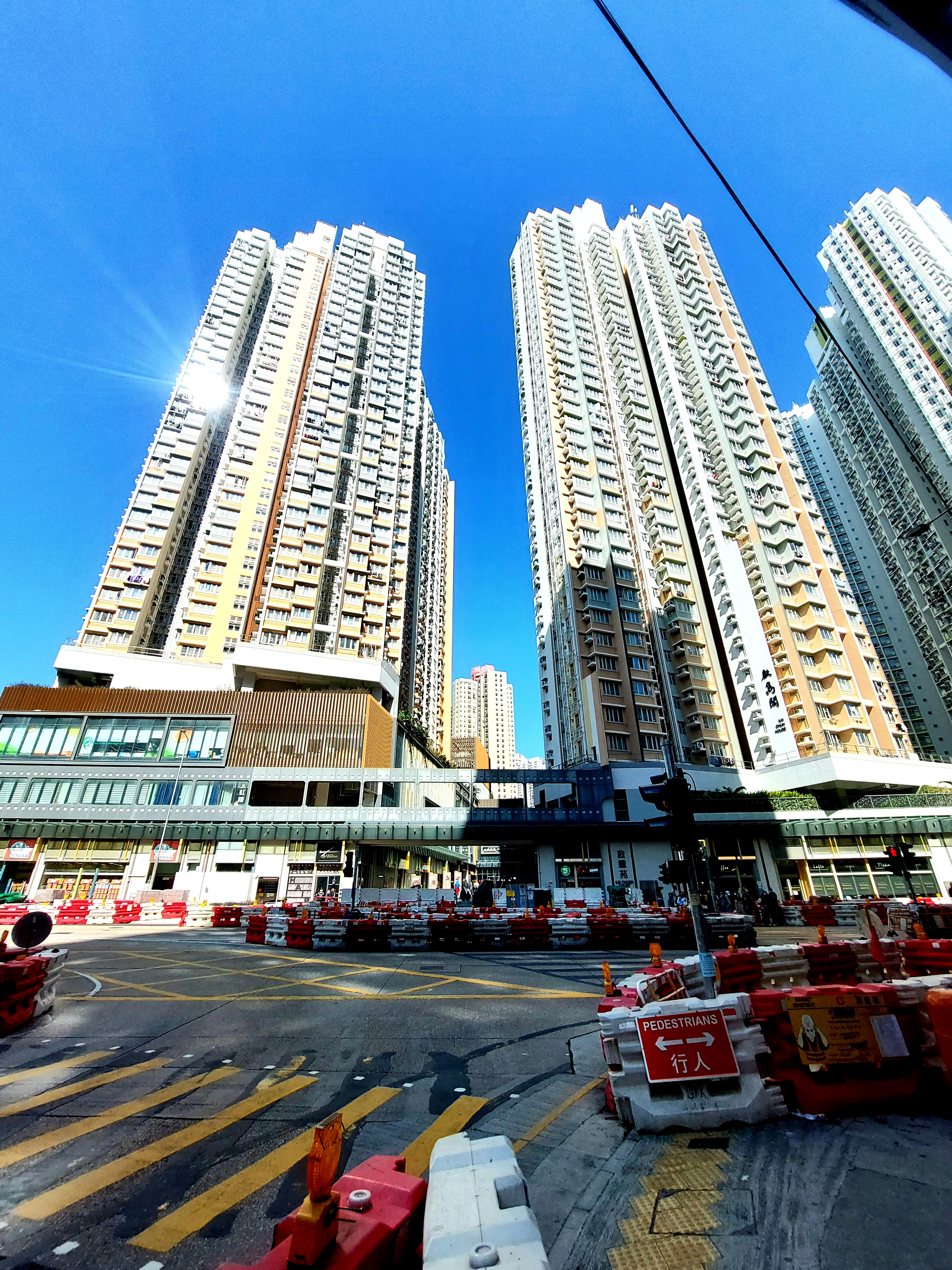
Kai Chuen Court in 2025

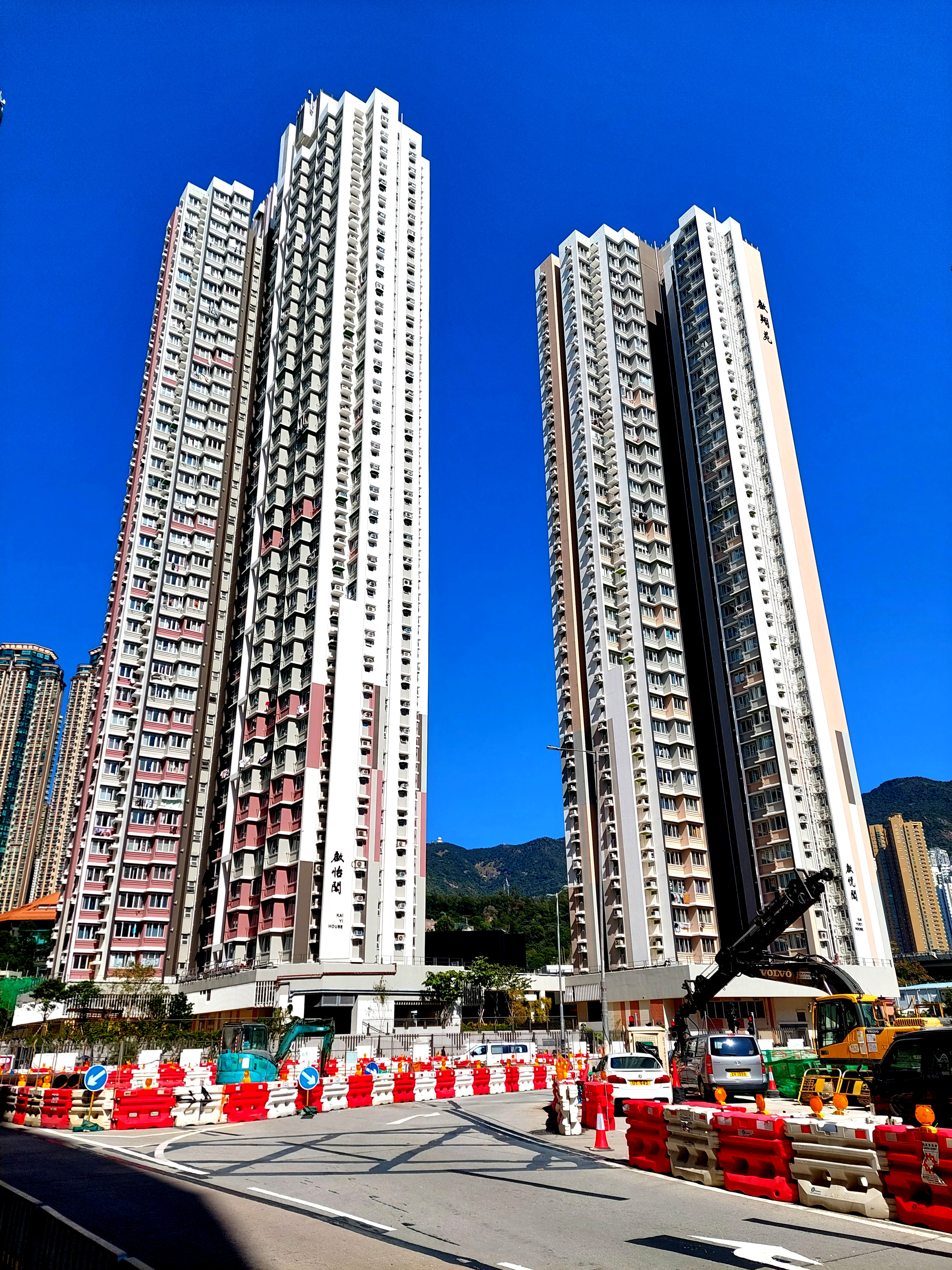
Kai Cheung Court in 2025

After the successful demolition of Tai Hom Village in early 2001, the village site has been left vacant and subject to various development plans proposed by the government and the public. The major ones include the construction of an Environmental Public Housing Estate, a Museum Complex, and the latest, the Sha Tin to Central Link depot of the MTRCL.

=== Transformation into an environmental public housing estate ===
The first development plan was officially announced in August 2000, when the Housing Department justified its plan to demolish Tai Hom Village on the grounds of urban renewal, proposing to transform the village into the first-ever Environmental Estate (expected to provide approximately 3,000 flats) in the site based on the notion of sustainable development. According to the Housing Department, the construction works were expected to be completed in 2006 at the earliest. No decision made on whether the flats would be offered for rental or sale notwithstanding, the spokesman for the Housing Department at that time claimed that flats with quality design would be offered for sale as public housing in general.

With its right to development granted to the Housing Authority by the Town Planning Board, the village site was planned to undergo mixed development: alongside the major initiatives to pursue housing development and found a School Village, the site was also zoned for commercial purpose. At that time, the Housing Authority was planning to incorporate several green design concepts into the development plan, such as:

- equipping a solar energy generation system;
- installing waste-water recycling facilities; and
- placing houseplants on designated floors of buildings in the estate.

To examine the feasibility of these concepts, the Housing Department decided to construct a "concept flat" as a testing model scheduled to be completed in 2001.

Nonetheless, since the demolition of the village, no further information respecting the above-mentioned plan has been released by the government; in December 2001, the spokesperson for the Housing Department indicated that the first Environmental Estate would be relocated to Shui Chuen O in Sha Tin instead. Furthermore, a member of the Housing Authority claimed that the Housing Department had not forwarded to them any information on the progress of the site's planning work. It was not until June 2002 that the original development plan for the village site was eventually suspended, when the government officially announced that no new plans for constructing public housing estates would be implemented the following few years.

In subsequent years the government has revived plans on building Public Housing Estates in Tai Hom. During 17 July 2015, the government approved to build Public Housing Estates and Home Ownership estates on the site of Tai Hom. Since then, Kai Chuen Court Phase 1 and Kai Cheung court has been completed in 2021 and 2023 respectively.

=== Construction of a museum complex ===
On 7 January 2003, the Wong Tai Sin District Council passed a motion, proposing that the government construct a Museum Complex with the theme "Theatre of the Orient" (「東方影城」) at the former Tai Hom Village site. Planned to be built in an Oriental architectural style, the Museum Complex would occupy more than 7 hectares of the village site. A rough estimate put the cost of the whole construction project at $3–4 billion or more (not inclusive of premium).

In their proposal, major suggestions put forward include:

- establishing Roman Tam Memorial Museum (羅文紀念館) aimed to feature his memorable showbiz career;
- arranging Performing Arts classes, in which experts would guide visitors through the ways to appreciate and learn the acting skills of such noted film stars as Bruce Lee, Chow Yun-fat and Jackie Chan;
- reconstructing such venues as the bamboo framed performing theatre of Yam Kim-fai (任劍輝) and Bak Sheut-sin (白雪仙) and the performing stage of Hong Xian-nu (紅線女); and
- displaying exhibits borrowed from such organisations as the Hong Kong Film Archive, film-making companies and TV stations on the development of Hong Kong music, movie and TV industries.

The proposal was submitted the following week to 3 bureaux of the government for consideration, including the Home Affairs Bureau, Housing, Planning and Lands Bureau, and Economic Development and Labour Bureau; however, the government did not map out a corresponding development plan for the former Village site afterwards.

=== Construction of Sha Tin to Central Link (SCL) depot ===
Originally, it was decided that the MTRCL train depot for the future Sha Tin-Central line be built at the former Kai Tak Airport site. It was not until October 2006 that the government released the Kai Tak redevelopment plan, under which the depot would have to be constructed in another district instead of the Airport site.

A month later, government sources revealed that the MTRCL train depot for the future Sha Tin-Central line might be relocated to Diamond Hill, and that the government was studying the feasibility of constructing the depot at the former Tai Hom Village site in particular; however, they emphasised that other pieces of land apart from Diamond Hill could be possible sites for building the depot, so long as they were situated along the new rail line.

Some people from the real estate industry were concerned that the depot construction at the village site would decrease the price of the land, considering that the piece of land was worth more than HK$10 billion; however, according to Centaline Surveyors managing director Victor Lai Kin-fai, it all depended on whether any real estate would be built on the depot and its subsequent impact on the neighbourhood.

In July 2007, the MTRCL released a revised proposal on the construction of the SCL, which confirmed that the train deport concerned would be built on the land at the former Tai Hom Village site, with property development projects atop the depot. The construction of a new separate depot proved necessary, with the existing depots considered by the Transport and Housing Department and MTRCL as unable to meet the needs of SCL (see Table 2).

Table 2: Reasons for existing train depots' inability to accommodate the construction of the SCL

| Existing depot facility | Reason(s) for its incapability to accommodate the SCL |
|---|---|
| KCR Ho Tung Lau Maintenance Centre | The centre was inaccessible by SCL trains running between Ma On Shan Rail and the West Rail. |
| Pat Heung Maintenance Centre | The centre had limited scope for further expansion and the additional capacity to be used for the future Northern Link. |
| Tai Wai Maintenance Centre | The centre had no scope for further expansion. |
| MTR Kowloon Bay Depot | The Centre lacked spare capacity to accommodate all SCL trains; and the KCRC rolling stocks, signalling system and power supply system of the SCL trains were incompatible with those of the MTR system. |

In view of the oppositions to and queries about the SCL project from the local community, the government has responded by:

- employing a "semi-depressed" design such that the depot will be only 1.5 to 6m above ground, thereby mitigating the noise and visual intrusion brought about;
- conducting a Heritage Impact Assessment in view of the presence of historical structures at the former Village site; and
- keeping in touch with the public for discussion about any particulars as to the SCL project.

== See also ==
- Hollywood Hong Kong, a 2001 Hong Kong film directed by Fruit Chan, and set in Tai Hom Village.
