= Tsing Yi Hui =

Coordinates: 22.3555°N 114.1006°E

Tsing Yi Hui (Chinese: 青衣墟) was a town on Tsing Yi Island, Hong Kong. Many people at that time referred to the town as Tsing Yi Main Street (青衣大街), namely the main street of the town.

In Cantonese, the character hui (墟) means a periodic market, where people gather at a fixed time, usually every nine to ten days. However, the stalls and shops open every day in the town. It is the possibly one of the reasons that people called the town main street.

== Transport ==
The town was adjacent to Tsing Yi Bay and Tsing Yi Lagoon. In the early days, the town had no motor roads. Residents travelled on foot within the island and external transport totally relied on sea. Taking a sampan to Tsuen Wan was a typical example. Later the Hongkong and Yaumati Ferry provided services to and from Tsuen Wan Town (Tsuen Wan Pier) to the old Tsing Yi Pier beginning in 1980s. Later the service extended to Central, Victoria. Service ended in 2000.

Upon the completion of Tsing Yi Bridge, roads were built to various places including Tsing Yi Town. Kowloon Motor Bus established bus routes to Tsuen Wan Town and Mei Foo.

== Relocation ==
Upon the demolition of Tsing Yi Market, most of shops in the town were relocated to the re-sited villages of Chung Mei and Lo Uk near Sheung Ko Tan. Shops open on the ground floor of houses and form a market. The informal Chung Mei Market still operates as of 2006 and is busy every early morning.

== See also ==
- Tsing Yi Town
