= Tsing Yi Promenade =

Promenade in Tsing Yi, Hong Kong

Coordinates: 22.3537°N 114.1095°E

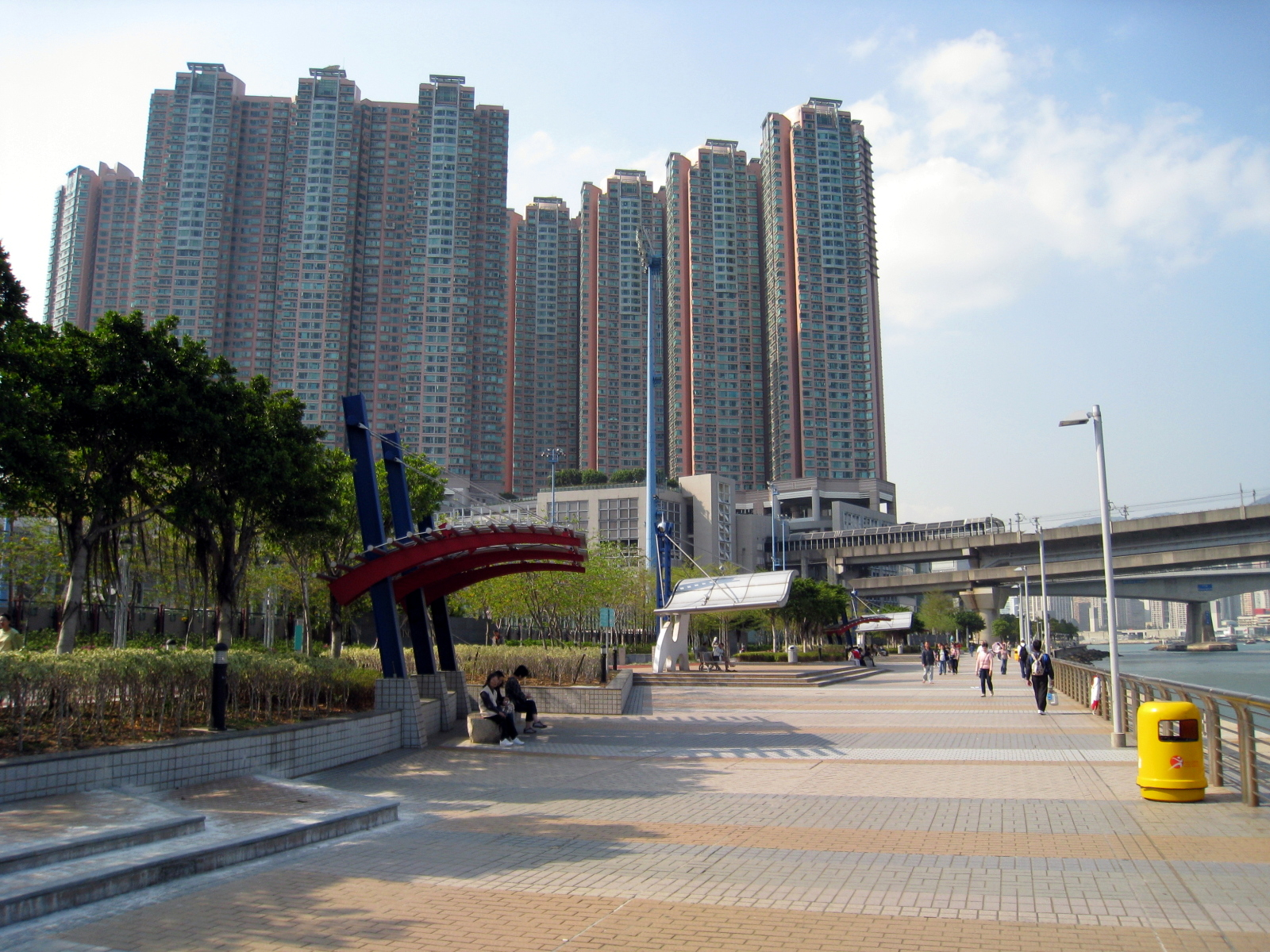
Tsing Yi Promenade

Tsing Yi Promenade (Chinese: 青衣海濱公園) is a promenade along the northeastern seafront of Tsing Yi Island, Hong Kong. It was built in stages from 2001 to 2004.

The Promenade faces Rambler Channel, from Greenfield Garden, through Tsing Yi Pier and Maritime Square to Cheung Fat Estate. At the end of this promenade is the Tsing Yi Northeast Park. The promenade spans 1,800 metres (5,900 ft) and occupies 6.6 hectares (16 acres) along the waterfront. Many people use this as a recreational area for jogging, exercising, and practising tai chi. There is a marvellous sea view for people to enjoy at night.

== Gallery ==
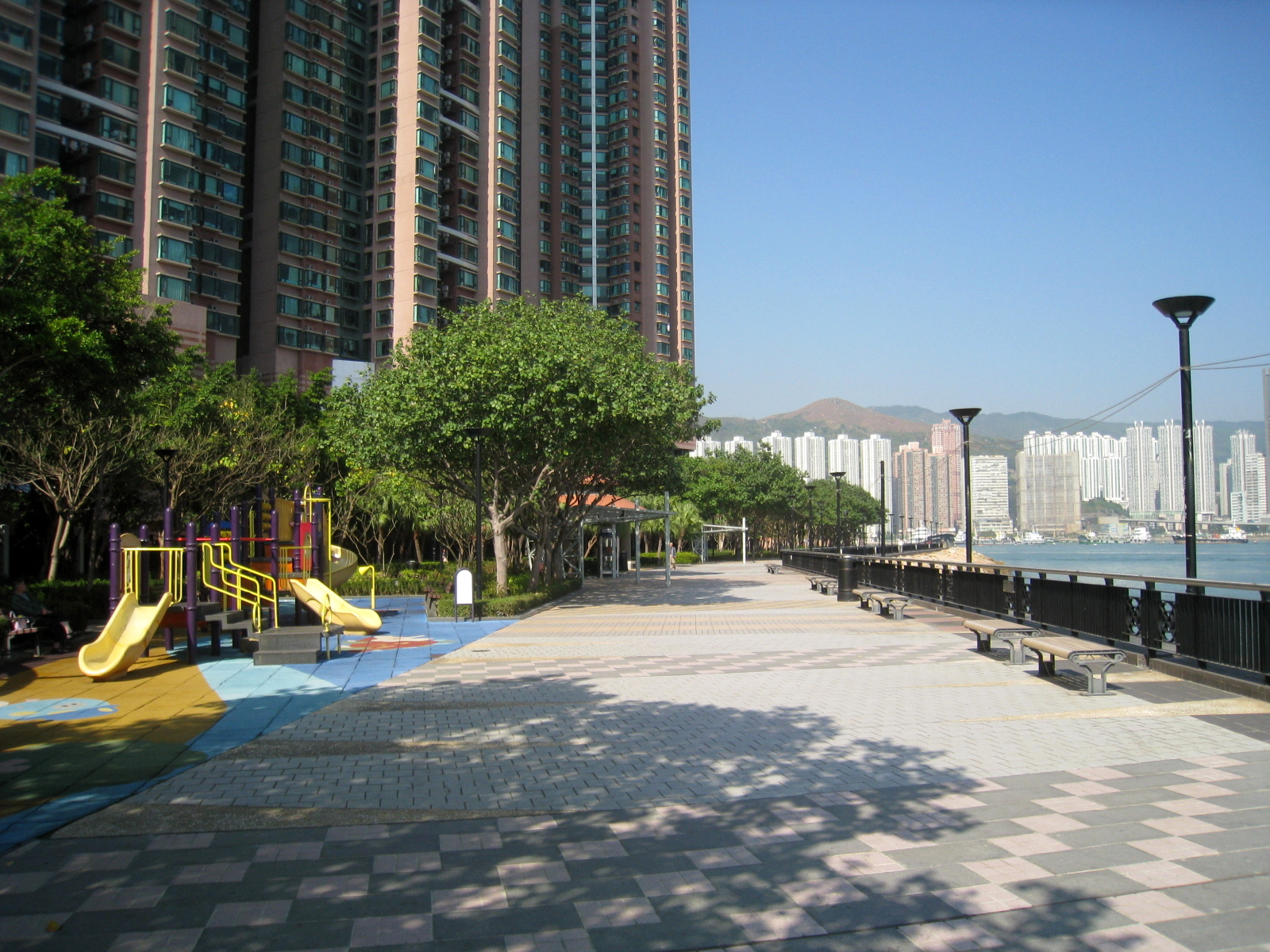
Promenade

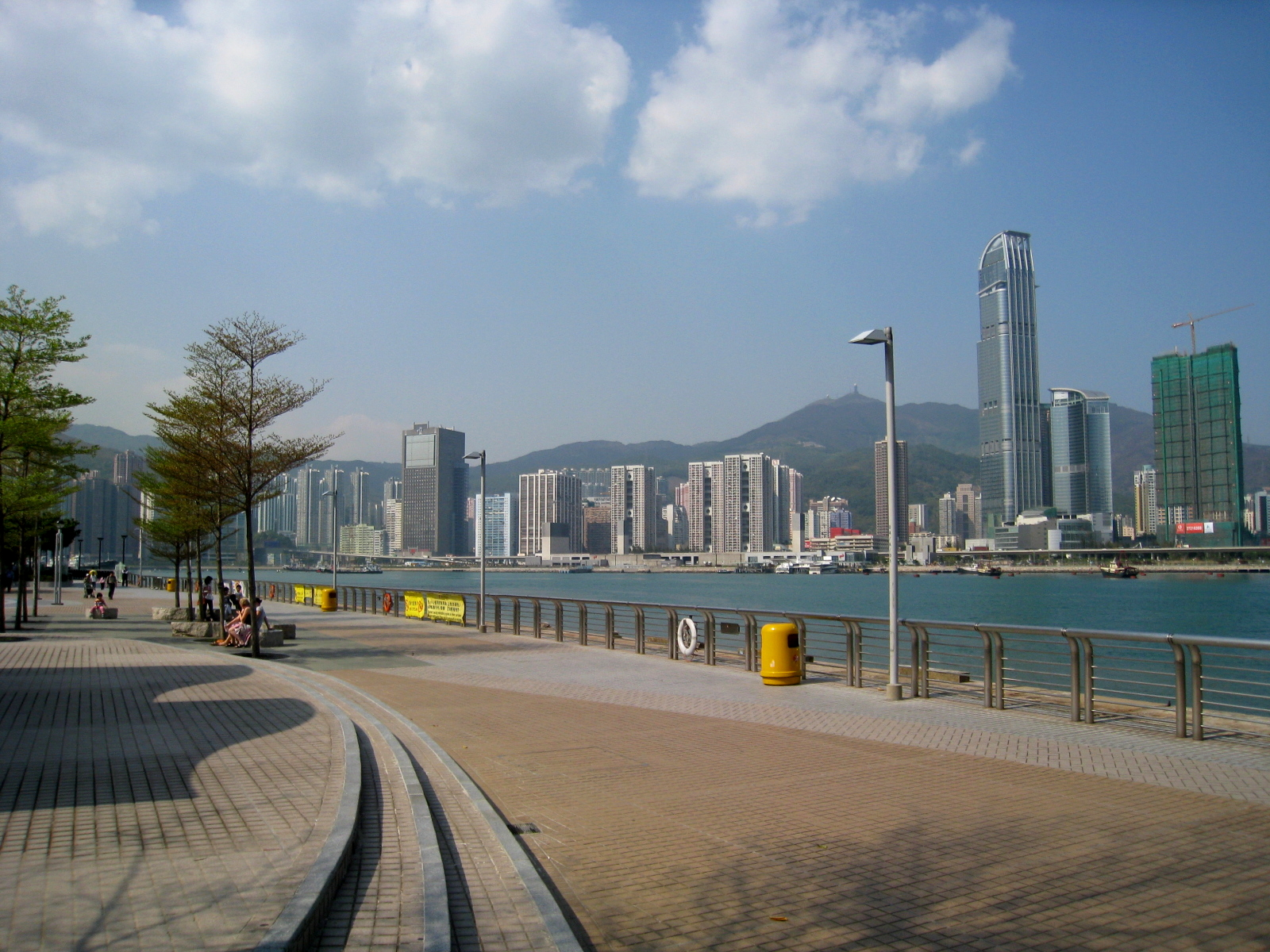
Seaview from Tsing Yi Promenade

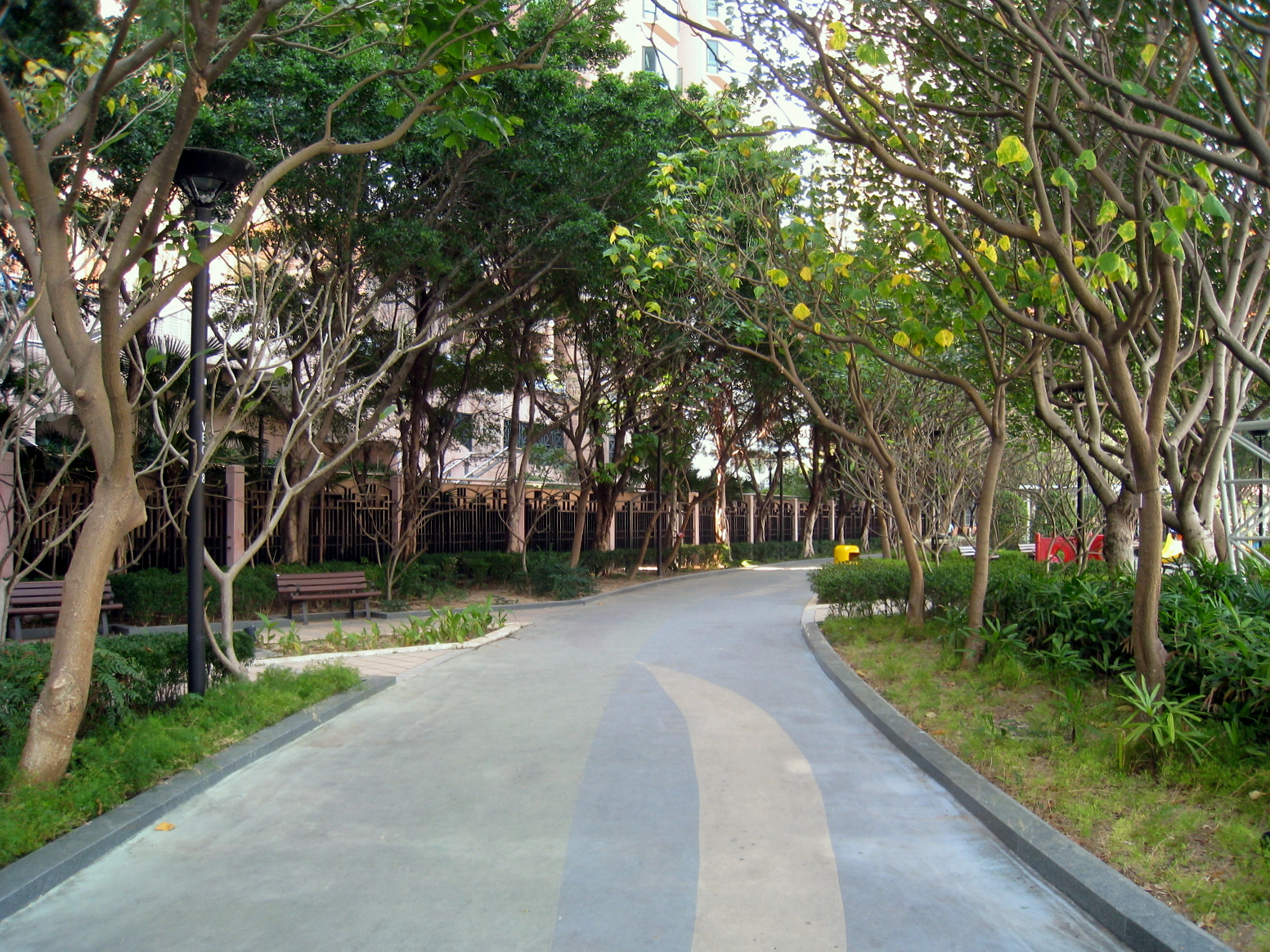
Jogging track at the promenade

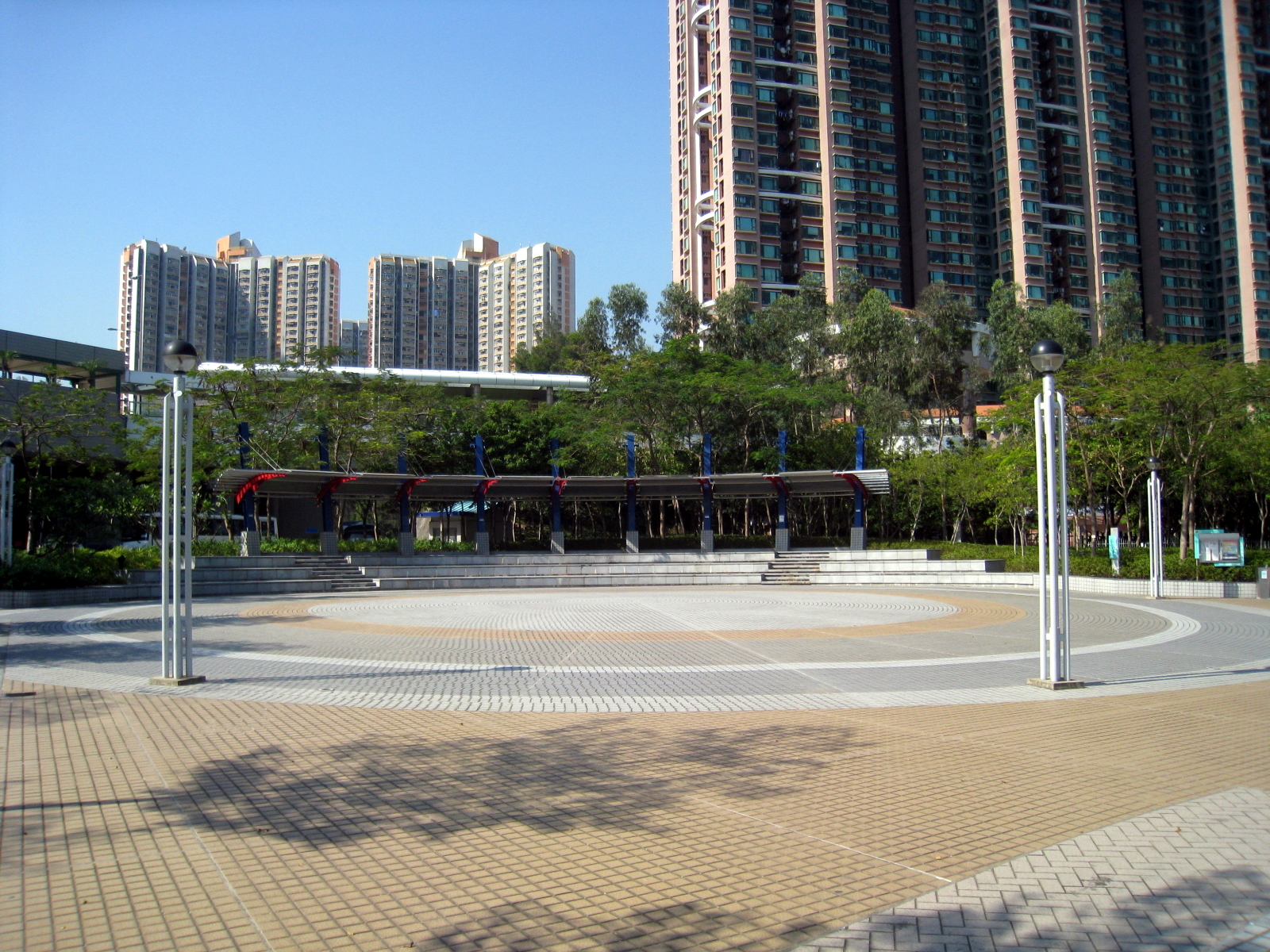
An open area for arts performances, practices and gatherings

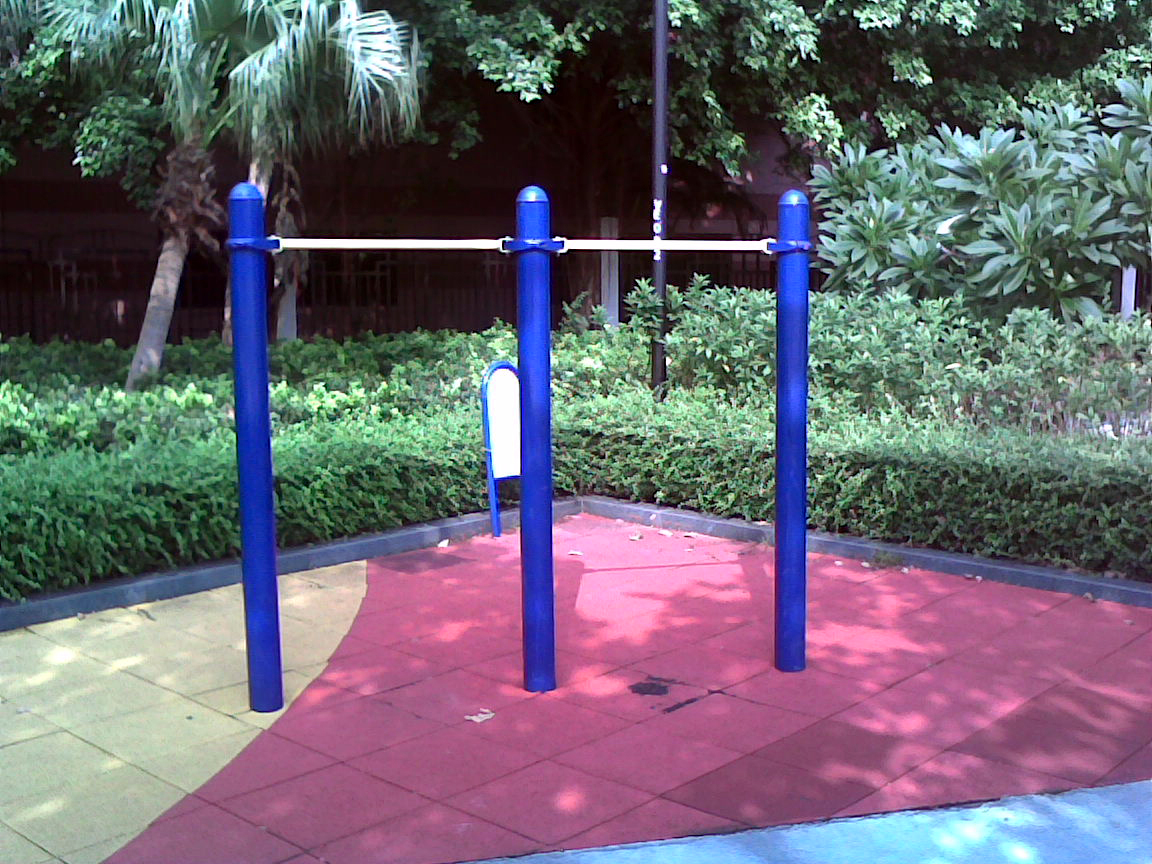
Fitness facilities.

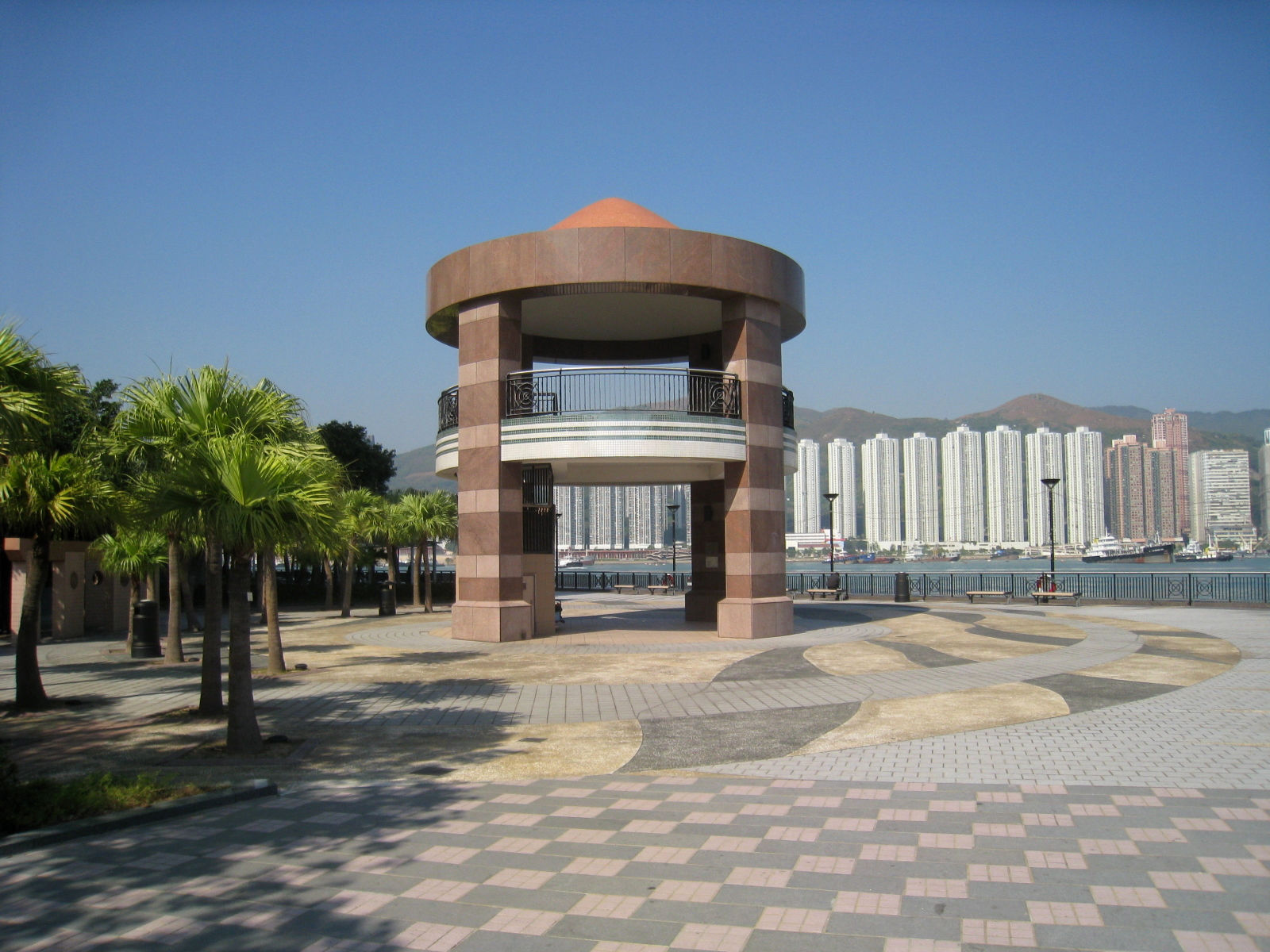
The gazebo, a good place to take a look at the seaview.

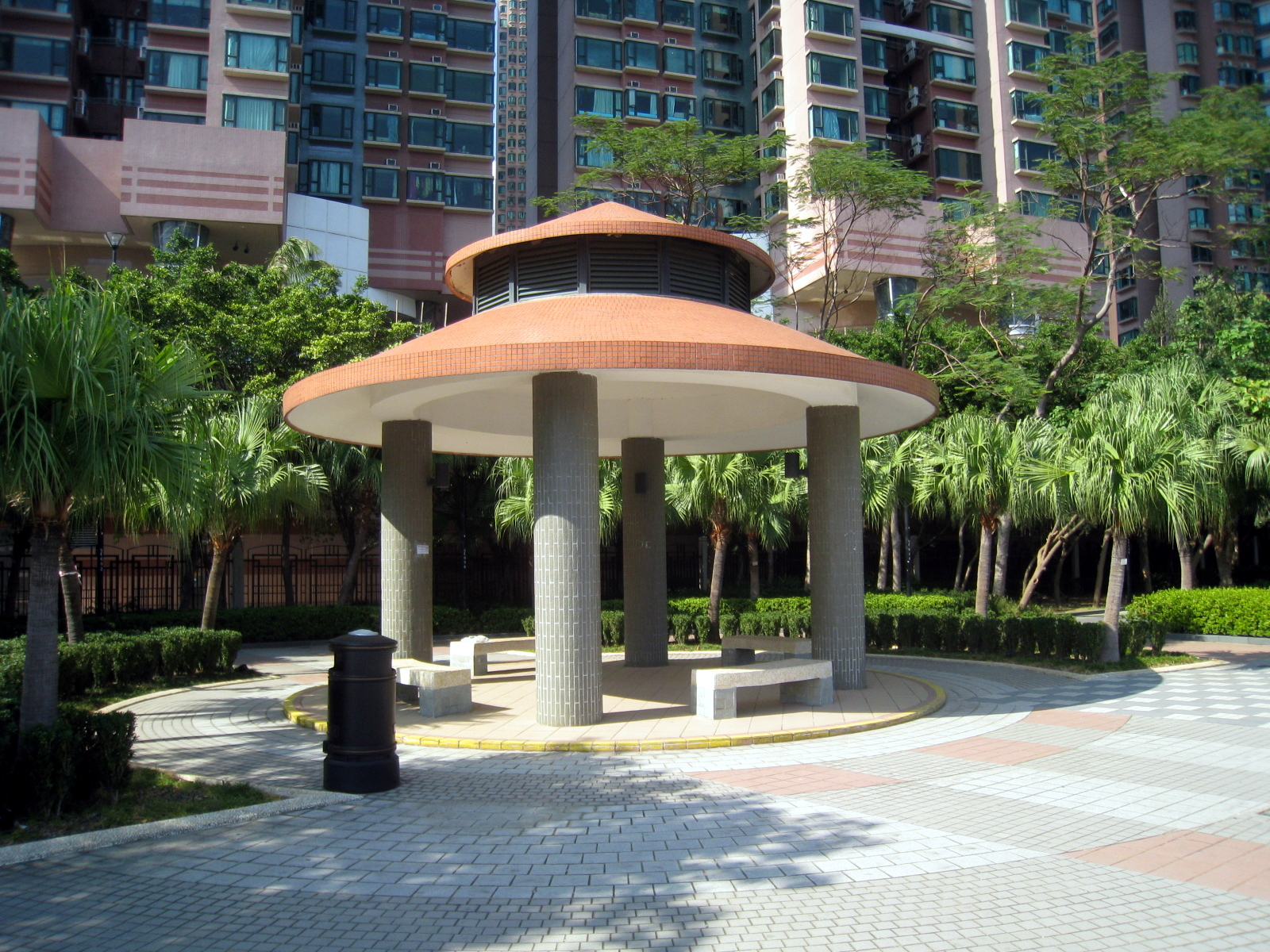
There is a pavilion at the promenade.

== See also ==
- List of urban public parks and gardens in Hong Kong
- Tsing Yi Swimming Pool
