= Liu To Village =

Village in Hong Kong

Coordinates: 22.351798°N 114.097786°E

Liu To Village (Chinese: 寮肚村) is one of the oldest villages in Tsing Yi Island, Hong Kong. It has at least 200 years of history.

Liu To Village is located in the Liu To valley. It is surrounded by three mountains and divided into three small communities: North Liu To Village, South Liu To Village and South-west Liu To Village. Some of the housings are squatters; some of them are licensed village houses. In the early 1990s, there were about 300 villagers.
