= Tsing Yi Pier =

Defunct pier in Tsing Yi, Hong Kong

Coordinates: 22.3540°N 114.1095°E

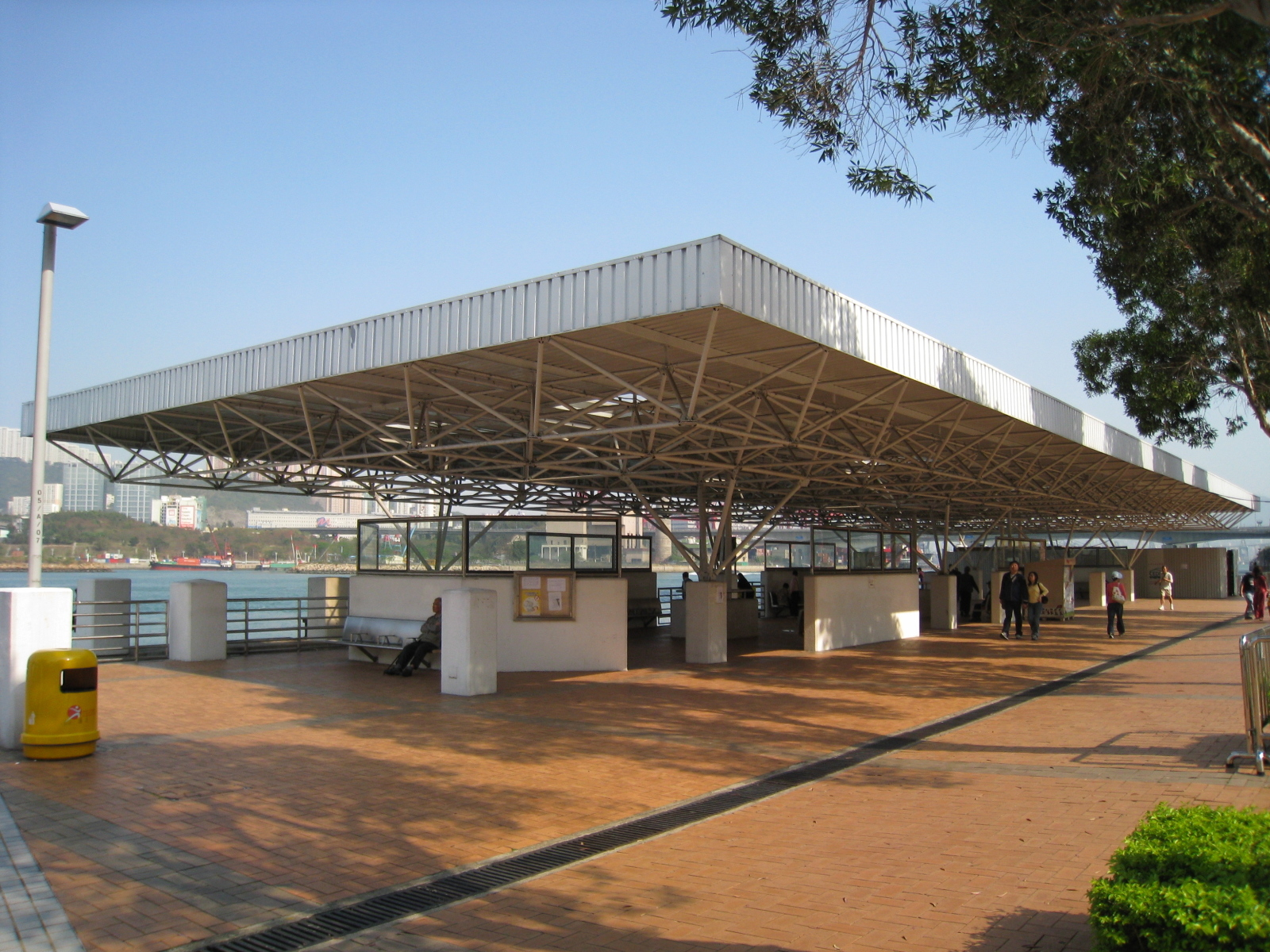
Tsing Yi Pier

Tsing Yi Pier (Chinese: 青衣碼頭) or Tsing Yi Ferry Terminus (青衣渡輪碼頭) was a ferry pier on Tsing Yi Island, Hong Kong. It replaced Tsing Yi Town old pier that was buried during land reclamation. There were ferries to Tsuen Wan and Central. The service ceased to exist and the pier was free for public use thereafter.

== Location ==
The pier is on the east seafront of reclaimed land of Tsing Yi Bay, near Tsing Leng Tsui, facing Rambler Channel. Three housing estates Greenfield Garden, Grand Horizon and Serene Garden are very close to it.

== History ==
The pier dates prior to 1961. It has provided access to ferry services since at least the 1960s.

In June 2024, a cargo ship collided with the pier causing damage to the pier and ship, but no injuries were reported.
