= Chan Lai So Chun Memorial School =

School in Hong Kong

Coordinates: 22.3461°N 114.1089°E

- Chinese: 香港四邑商工總會陳黎繡珍紀念學校
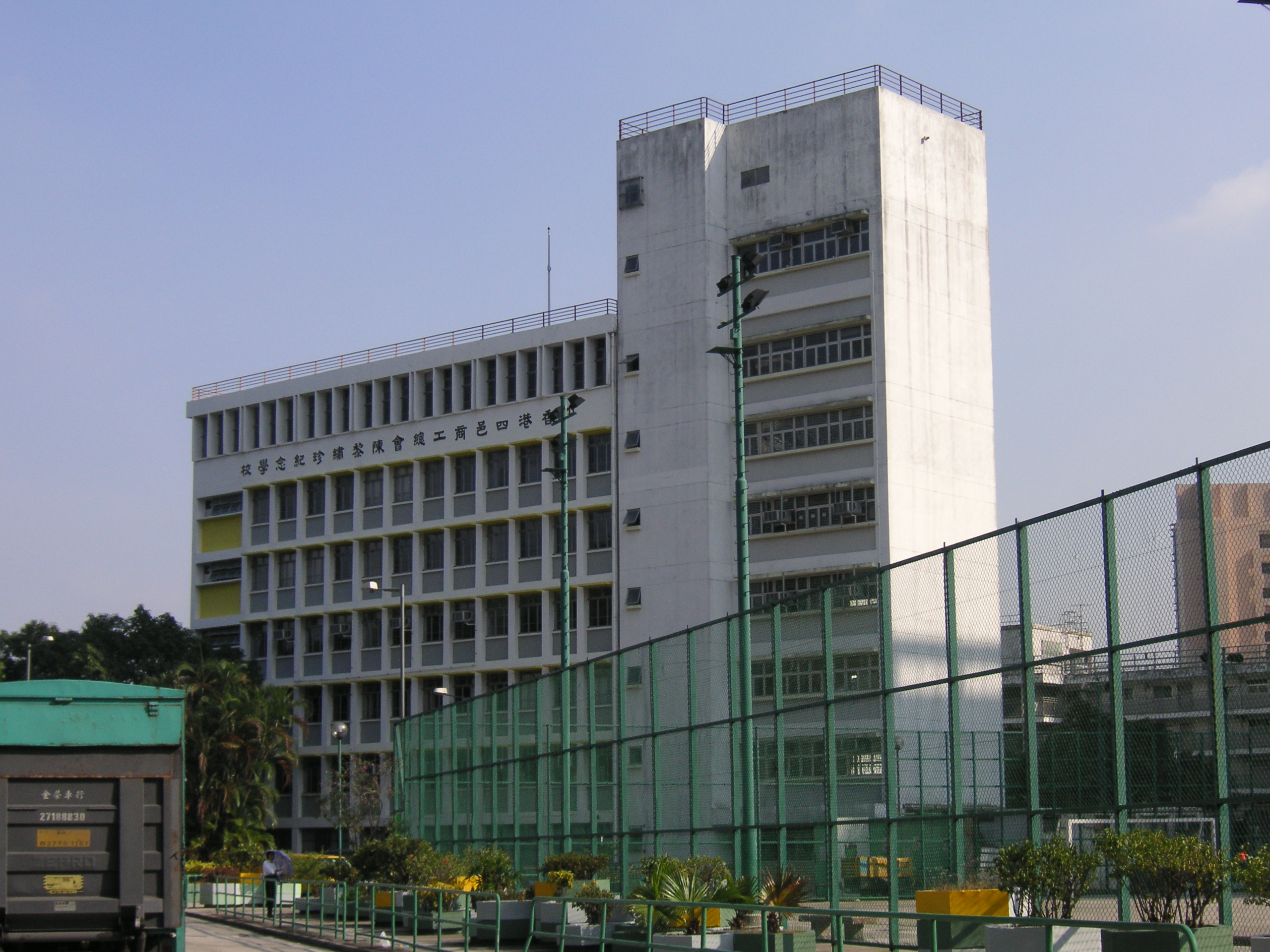

Information
- Established: 1977
- Closed: 2006

The Hong Kong Sze Yap Commercial & Industrial Association Chan Lai So Chun Memorial School (Chinese: 香港四邑商工總會陳黎繡珍紀念學校) or simply Chan Lai So Chun Memorial School was a primary school founded by the Hong Kong Sze Yap Commercial & Industrial Association in Cheung Ching Estate on the Tsing Yi Island, Hong Kong. Built in 1977, it was designated as Estate School Number 1 of the estate, close to Ching Hong Road. The school provided Primary 1 to Primary 6 education.

== Background ==
The school was organised by the Hong Kong Sze Yap Commercial & Industrial Association. During imperial China, Sze Yap refers to the four counties of Sun Wui, Sunning (later known as Toi Shan), Hoi Ping, and Yan Ping, located in Kwangtung (now Guangdong) province. Although Sze Yap was relatively close to the provincial capital, Canton (now Guangzhou), it was somewhat isolated, as the main river did not pass through these counties. The people spoke Hoishanese, a branch of Cantonese. Many of them migrated to Hong Kong following the beginning of British colonial rule, seeking new opportunities in this new city. There are four streets, Sun Wui Road, Sunning Road, Hoi Ping Road and Yun Ping Road in Lee Garden, next to busiest section in Causeway Bay, reflecting their economical success in the metropolis.

The association was established in 1909 in Hong Kong, three years before the end of imperial China. After the Second World War, it established several schools in Hong Kong, namely Wong Tai Shan Memorial College, Chan Nam Chong Memorial College, Hong Kong Sze Yap Commercial & Industrial Association San Wui Commercial Society School, and Hong Kong Sze Yap Commercial & Industrial Association Chan Nam Chong Memorial School, apart from Chan Lai So Chun Memorial School.

The school was organised by the association and its construction was funded by Chan Pak Keung, a philanthropist and a Hong Kong-based architect renowned for designing hospitals in the city. He was the son of Chan Nam Chong, a prominent tycoon and philanthropist in Hong Kong, and Chan Lai So Chun. The school was named in honour of his mother, Chan Lai So Chun. He himself served as supervisor of the school.

As a side note, another school along the same road on the island, Po Leung Kuk Mr. & Mrs. Chan Pak Keung Tsing Yi School, a special school, was named in honour of Chan Pak Keung and his wife.

== History ==
Opened in 1977, and largely rural at the time, the school was the first primary school in the Cheung Ching Estate, the first public housing estate on Tsing Yi Island, marking the beginning of the island's urbanisation. The official opening ceremony was held on 10 October 1978 and was unveiled by Sir David Akers-Jones, the Secretary for the New Territories. During the ceremony, he highlighted that the island was set to develop into a city with a population of 180,000 residents. Following the opening of Tsing Yi Bridge, the first bridge connecting to the island, on 28 February 1974, the number of residents in this new estate had already surged to 12,000. Sir David Akers-Jones also expressed appreciation for Chan Pak Keung's generous funding of the school, which served as a memorial to his mother. He further acknowledged and appreciated the association's contribution to the development of the school.

While the school building of Buddhist Yip Kei Nam Memorial College was under construction, the college borrowed the school classrooms for lessons in 1978.

The school operated as both a morning and an afternoon school. In the mid-1990s, the two sessions were merged following the education policy shift towards whole-day schooling.

Due to the continuing decline in the birth rate in Hong Kong, in the 1995/96 academic year, the school struggled to recruit sufficient pupils, leading to a reduction in Primary 1 classes from four to two. The following year, this was further reduced to a single class. In 2002, the school celebrated its 25th anniversary, but just a year later, in 2003, the Education Bureau ordered the school to cease Primary 1 admissions. and it was officially closed after the summer of 2006, after 29 years of operation. All pupils were transferred to TWGHs Chow Yin Sum Primary School.

Beginning from 2000, several unused classrooms were loaned to the Education Department for use as adult evening school facilities.

== Building ==
The school premises covered an area of over 3,000 square metres. It was constructed according to the standard school building design of the time. Although originally built in 1977, a new extension was added in 1999 as part of the School Improvement Programme.

The total floor area of the school building is approximately 2,460 square metres, comprising twenty-three classrooms and seven special rooms. These include an art room, a computer room, a library, a music room, two remedial rooms and a student activity centre. In addition, the school features a covered playground and a hall.

== Polling Station ==
The covered playground was used as a polling station during various elections, namely District Board/District Council, Regional Council and Legislative Council, before it was demolished.

== Aftermath ==
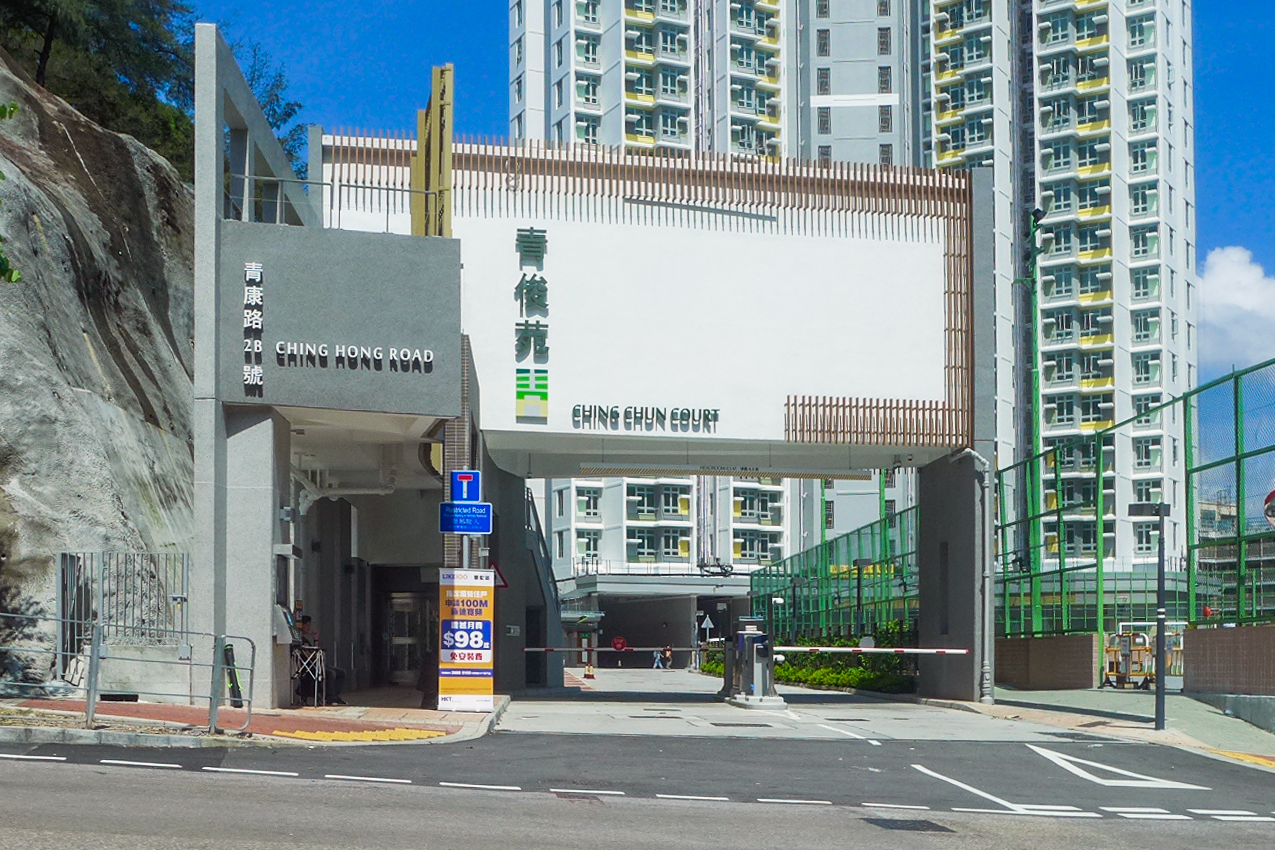
The school was replaced by two blocks of high-rise residential buildings in Ching Chun Court.

The vacant school building was initially assigned to The International Montessori Education Foundation Limited for use as an international school. However, the development never materialised, and the assignment was eventually withdrawn, leaving the building empty.

In October 2011, the Hong Kong government announced plans for the demolition of the school. Demolition work began in 2012, and the site was eventually transformed into Ching Chun Court, a housing estate under the Home Ownership Scheme. The development was completed in 2017.
