= Liu To =

Area in Tsing Yi Island, Hong Kong

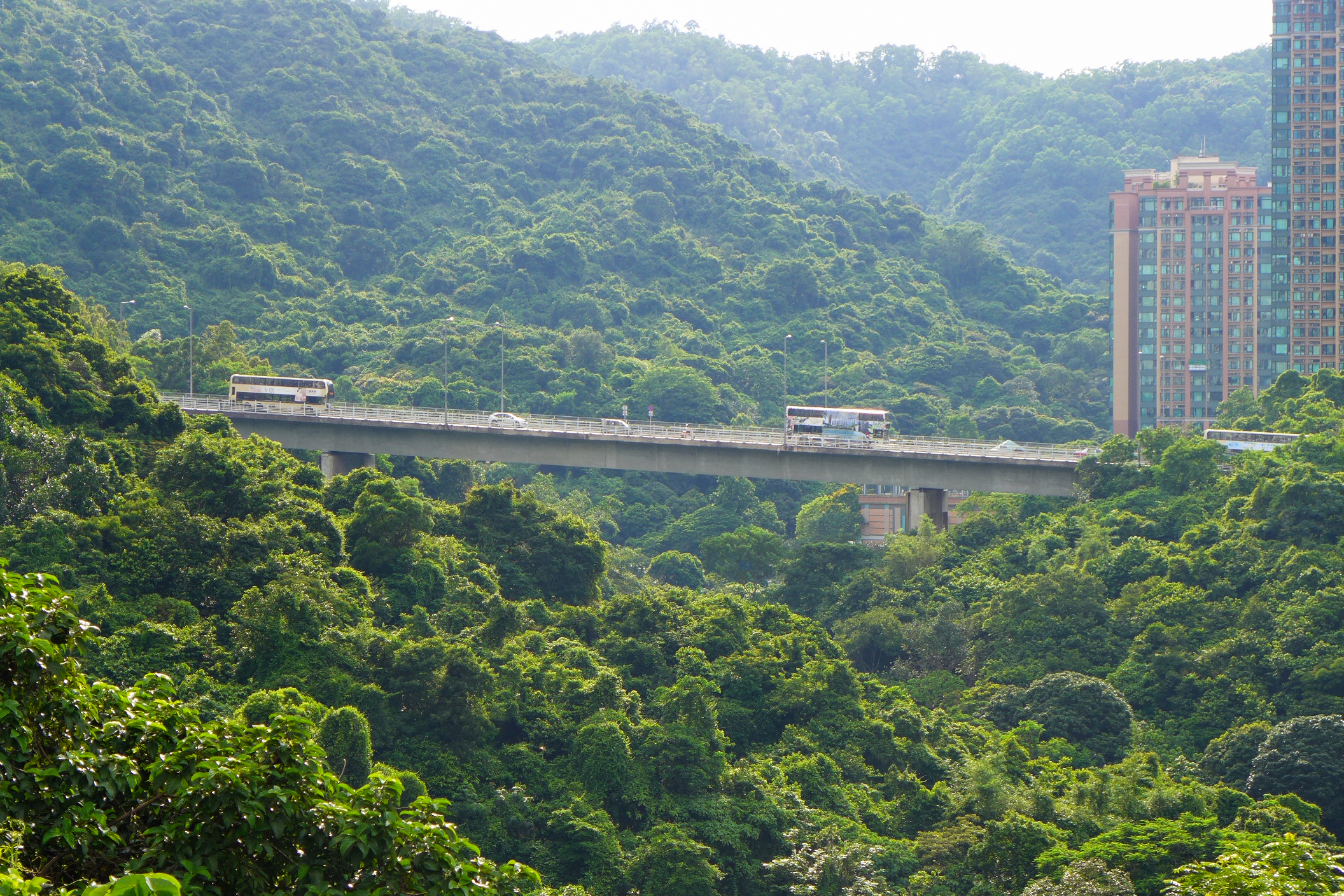

- Location within Hong Kong

Geography
- Coordinates: 22.3528°N 114.0972°E
- Interactive map of Liu To

Liu To (Chinese: 寮肚) is the area around the valley in the midwest of Tsing Yi Island. There is a stream in the valley watering the narrow band of agricultural fields of Liu To Village (寮肚村). Its water formerly filled the Tsing Yi Lagoon and nurtured the rice paddies around the lagoon but now is just water flowing in the underground nullah to the Rambler Channel. The valley has occasionally been referred to as the Liu To Valley (寮肚坑) and the surrounding hills as Liu To Hill (寮肚山).

The Mount Haven (曉峰園) private housing estate sits deep in the valley, while the Cheung Wang Estate and the Cheung Hang Estate stand on the surrounding hills to the north. Liu To Bridge, part of Tsing Yi West Road, spans the valley.

The Tsing Yi Nature Trail runs over the hills at the back of the valley.
