= Rambler Crest =

Housing estate in Tsing Yi, New Territories

Coordinates: 22°20′35″N 114°06′36″E

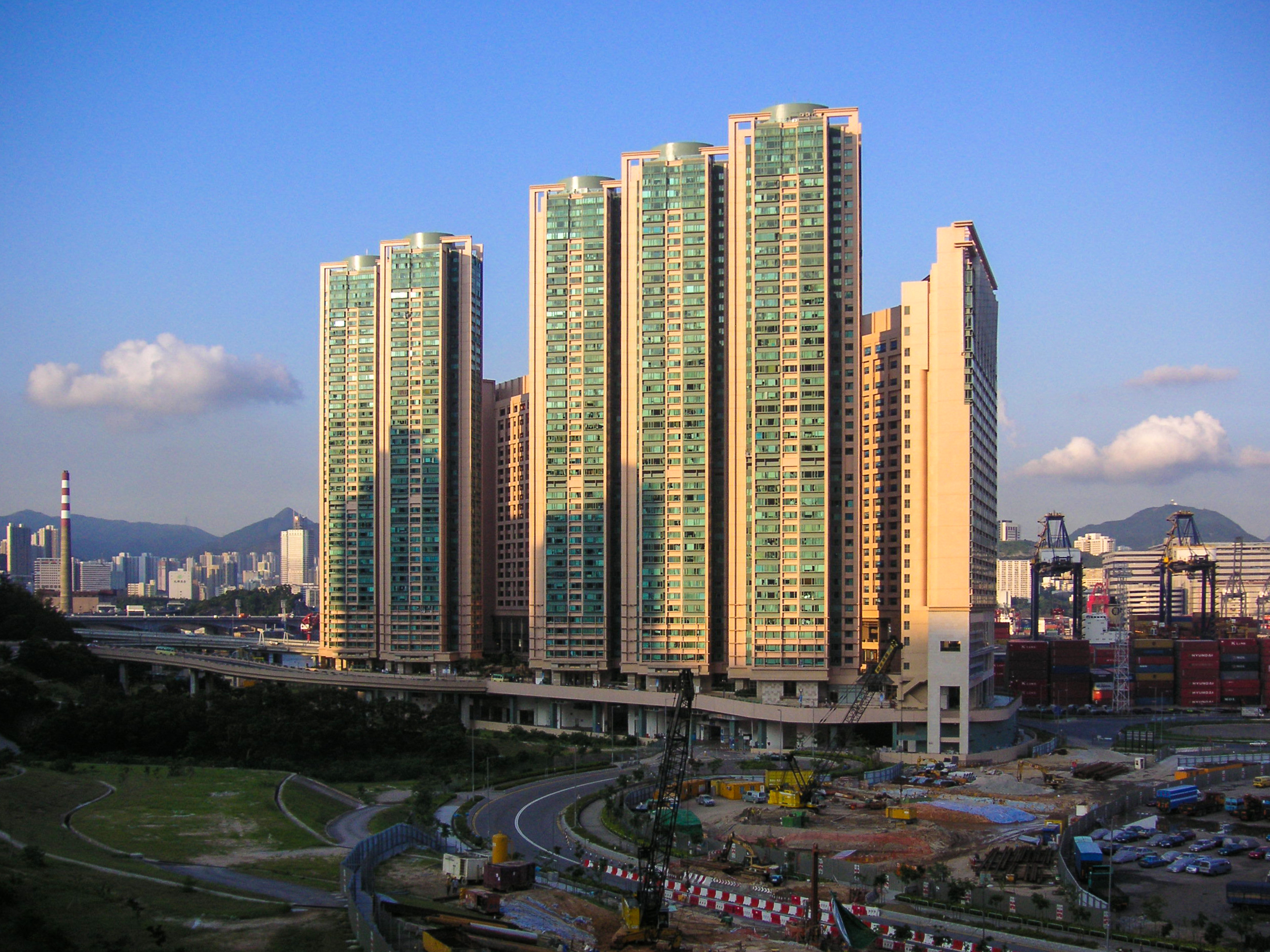
Rambler Crest on Tsing Yi Island.

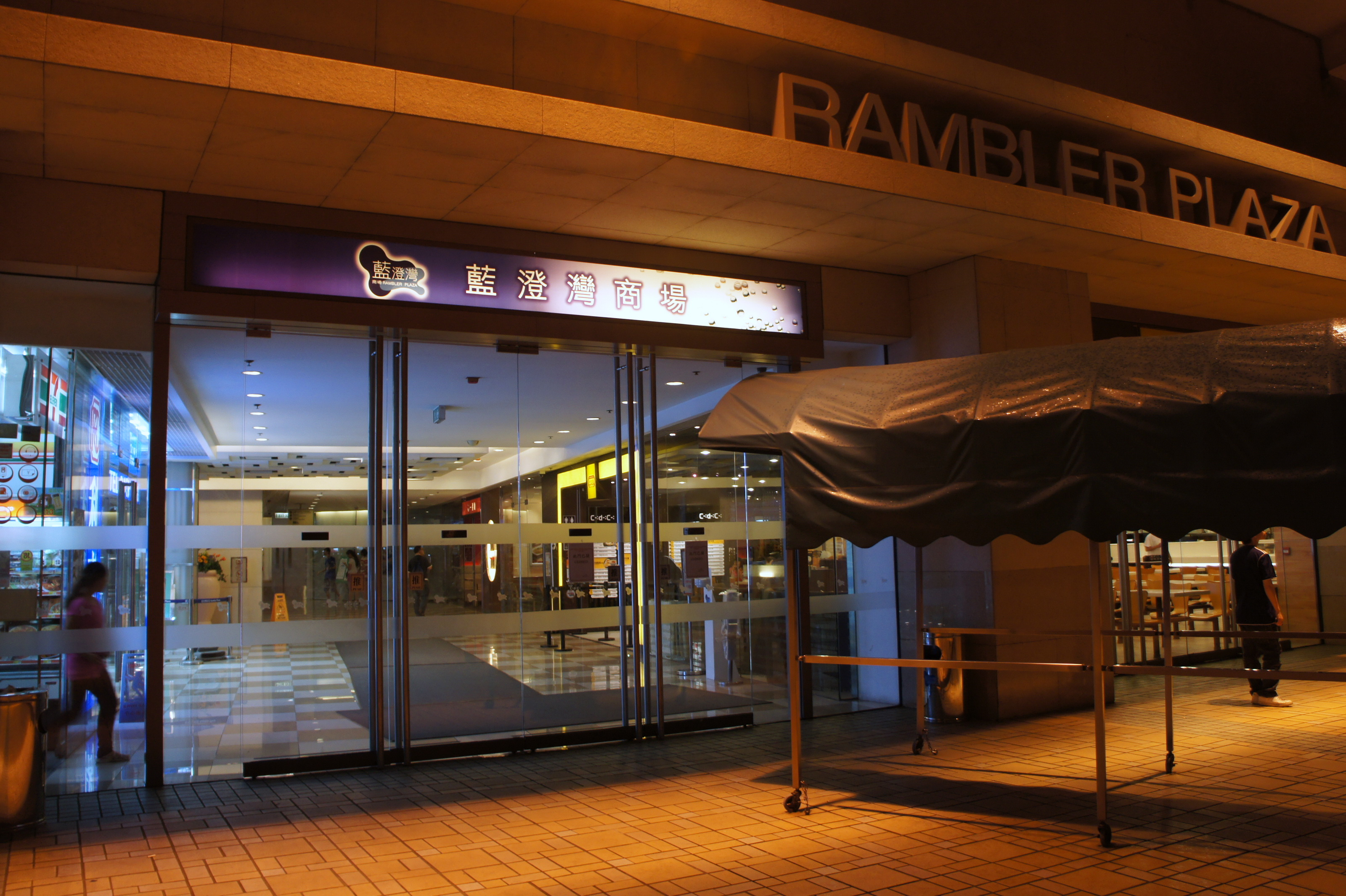
Entrance of Rambler Plaza, a shopping centre part of Rambler Crest.

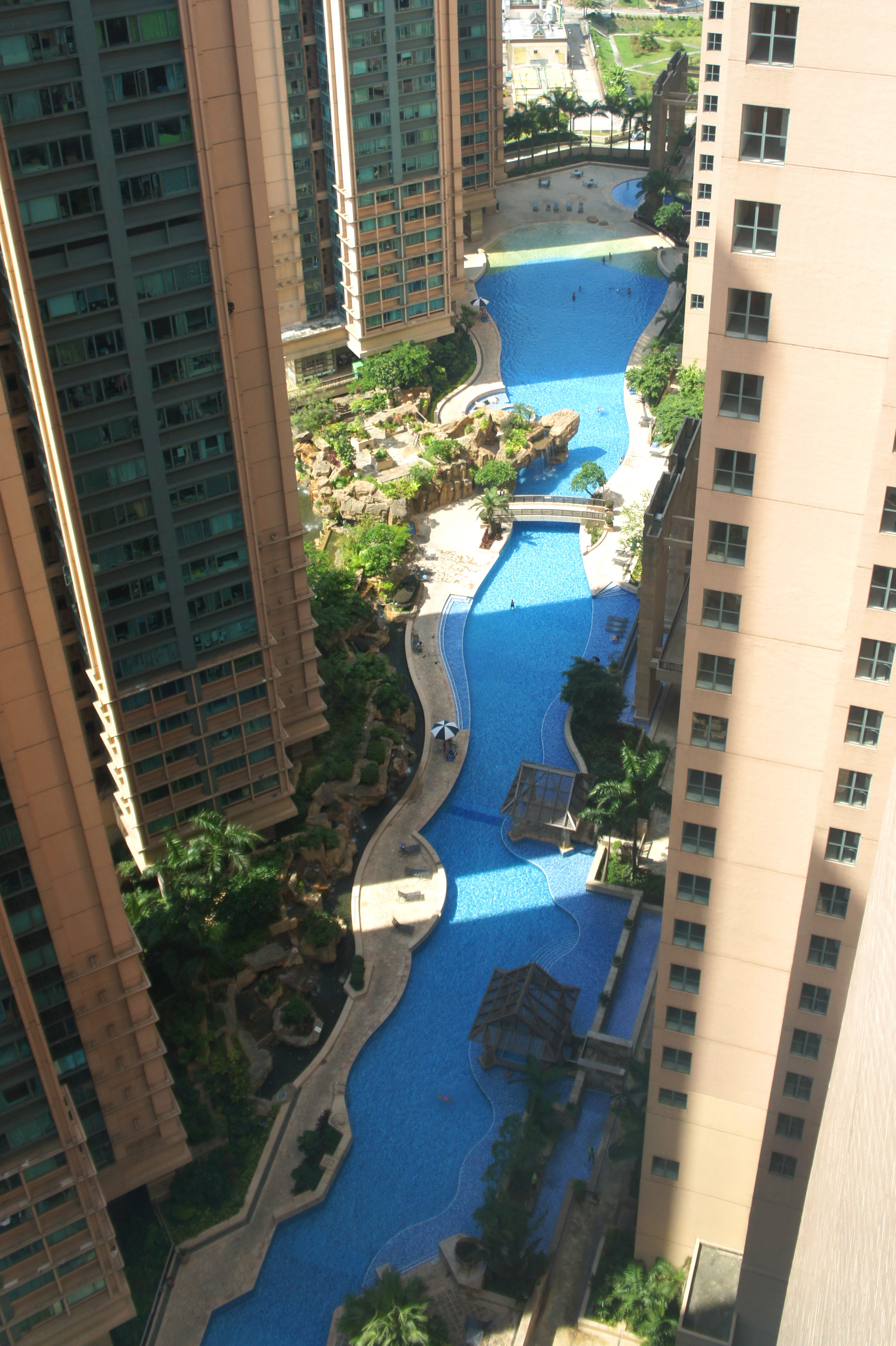
Rambler Crest swimming pool.

Rambler Crest (Chinese: 藍澄灣) is a housing development on Tsing Yi Island, Hong Kong, which includes a private housing estate, shopping mall and three hotels, namely Rambler Garden Hotel (華逸酒店), Rambler Oasis Hotel (青逸酒店) and Winland 800 Hotel (永倫800酒店). It was developed by Cheung Kong Holdings. The name Rambler comes from the name of nearby channel, Rambler Channel.

The 200 m (656 ft) private swimming pool at Rambler Crest is the longest swimming pool in Hong Kong.

== Location ==
Rambler Crest was built on the former site of a Mobil oil depot, located on Tsing Yi Road, Tsing Yi, NT. To the east are Hutchison Telecom Building and Container Terminal No.9. To the northwest are Cheung Ching Estate and Mayfair Gardens.

== History ==
The site was originally planned for hotel use only, rather than residential use because of its proximity to Container Terminal 9 already owned by Hutchison.

However, the development turned out to be a slab block of three hotels at the front and five additional 40-storey residential blocks at the back. The residential complex consists of 800 units of two or three bedroom flats with Gross Floor Areas from approx. 680 to 950 square feet (63 to 88 square meter) (translating into net usable floor area of between 540 and 760 square feet (50 and 71 square meter)).

== Hotels and shopping centre ==
The estate has a small shopping centre at the ground floor, and includes clubhouse facilities.

There are three hotels, each with roughly 800 rooms.

=== Rambler Garden Hotel ===
The Rambler Garden Hotel is owned and managed by Harbour Plaza Hotel Management.

=== Rambler Oasis Hotel ===
The Rambler Oasis Hotel is owned and managed by Harbour Plaza Hotel Management.

=== Winland 800 Hotel ===
The Winland 800 Hotel is operated by Hong Kong–based Mexan Limited. It has 800 rooms and was formerly called Mexan Harbour Hotel.

== Transport ==
There are two Maxicab lines in the estate:

- 88F to Tsing Yi MTR station
- 88G to Kwai Fong MTR station

The nearest bus-stop is above the hill, at Tsing Yi Road, outside Cheung Ching Estate which is well served by a number of Kowloon Motor Bus service routes. A32 of Long Win Bus is a direct bus service linking Rambler Crest to the Hong Kong International Airport.
