= Tsing Leng Tsui =

Former cape on Tsing Yi Island, Hong Kong

Coordinates: 22.3527°N 114.1096°E

Tsing Leng Tsui (Chinese: 青嶺嘴) is a former cape on Tsing Yi Island, Hong Kong between the former Tsing Yi Bay and the Rambler Channel. After several phases of reclamation, the cape lost its shape and became the location of the Hong Kong Cement Plant belonging to Hong Kong Cement Manufacturing Company Limited. The area changed to a promenade and the Grand Horizon residential estate after the plant was relocated to Ngau Kok Wan (牛角灣), northwest of the island, owing to environmental concerns voiced by residents of neighbouring Greenfield Garden.
