= Po Leung Kuk Tsing Yi Secondary School (Skill Opportunity) =

Secondary school in Hong Kong

Po Leung Kuk Tsing Yi Secondary School (Skill Opportunity) (Chinese: 保良局青衣中學(技能訓練)) was a skill opportunity secondary school on the Tsing Yi Island in the New Territories of Hong Kong. It was the skill opportunity school founded by Po Leung Kuk in 1998. At its opening ceremony, Anson Chan, the then-Acting Chief Executive of Hong Kong, gave an opening speech on 5 March 1999.

The school was closed in 2004 when the Hong Kong Government decided to close all skill opportunity schools and the building was transferred to Tung Wah Group of Hospitals for a new primary school, TWGHs Chow Yin Sum Primary School, in 2005.
