= Tsing Yi Bay =

Coordinates: 22.3563°N 114.1056°E

- Traditional Chinese: 青衣灣
- Simplified Chinese: 青衣湾
Transcriptions
Standard Mandarin
- Hanyu Pinyin: Qīngyīwān
Hakka
- Romanization: Ciang1 yi1 van1
Yue: Cantonese
- Jyutping: Cing1 ji1 wan1

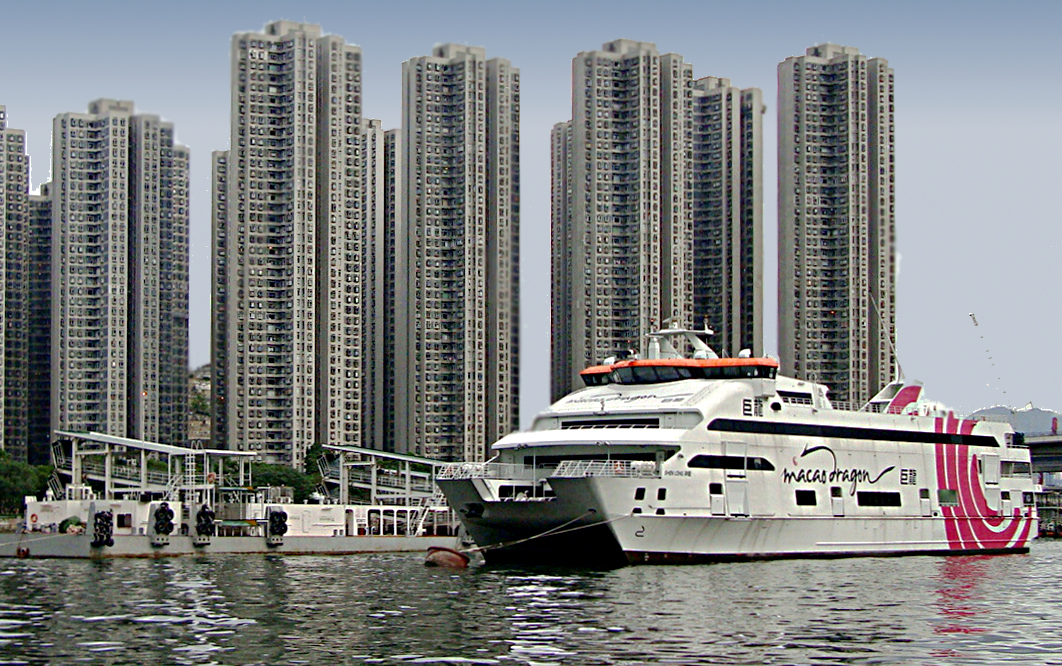
A ship in the Tsing Yi Bay

Tsing Yi Bay was a bay on the east side of Hong Kong's Tsing Yi Island, beside the Rambler Channel, approximately on the site of modern-day Tsing Yi Park. The whole bay was reclaimed for the development of new towns. Before reclamation, it was surrounded by places known as Tsing Leng Tsui, Sheung Ko Tan (上高灘), Ha Chung Mei, Tai Wong Ha and Tsing Yi Town. The names of these places have since changed, and can now be translated, approximately, as Grand Horizon, Green Field Garden, Fung Shue Wo Road, Tsing Yi Estate and Tsing Yi Garden.

== Silting up ==
The mud and sand in the stream of Liu To settled on the shores of Tsing Yi Bay. A marsh formed at the mouth of the stream and the water in the bay became shallower and shallower. Finally, an isthmus developed between Tsing Yi Town and Sheung Ko Tan. The inner water is now separated from the bay outside the isthmus to become Tsing Yi Lagoon.

== Reclamation ==
In the 1980s, the Hong Kong Government started to reclaim the bay in three phases. The bay has now been completely reclaimed and the shore has been straightened from Nga Ying Chau to Tsing Leng Tsui.
