= Buddhist Yip Kei Nam Memorial College =

Secondary school in Tsing Yi, Hong Kong

Coordinates: 22.3490°N 114.1086°E

- Established: 1978; 48 years ago
- Endowment: The Hong Kong Buddhist Association
- Administrative staff: Mr. So Ka Leung (B.Ed. (Hons.), M.Sc., M.A., Prof. Dip.)
- Location: Tsing Yi, Hong Kong
- Mascot: To Illumine Wisdom and Manifest Compassion
- Website: www.byknmc.edu.hk/rIndex

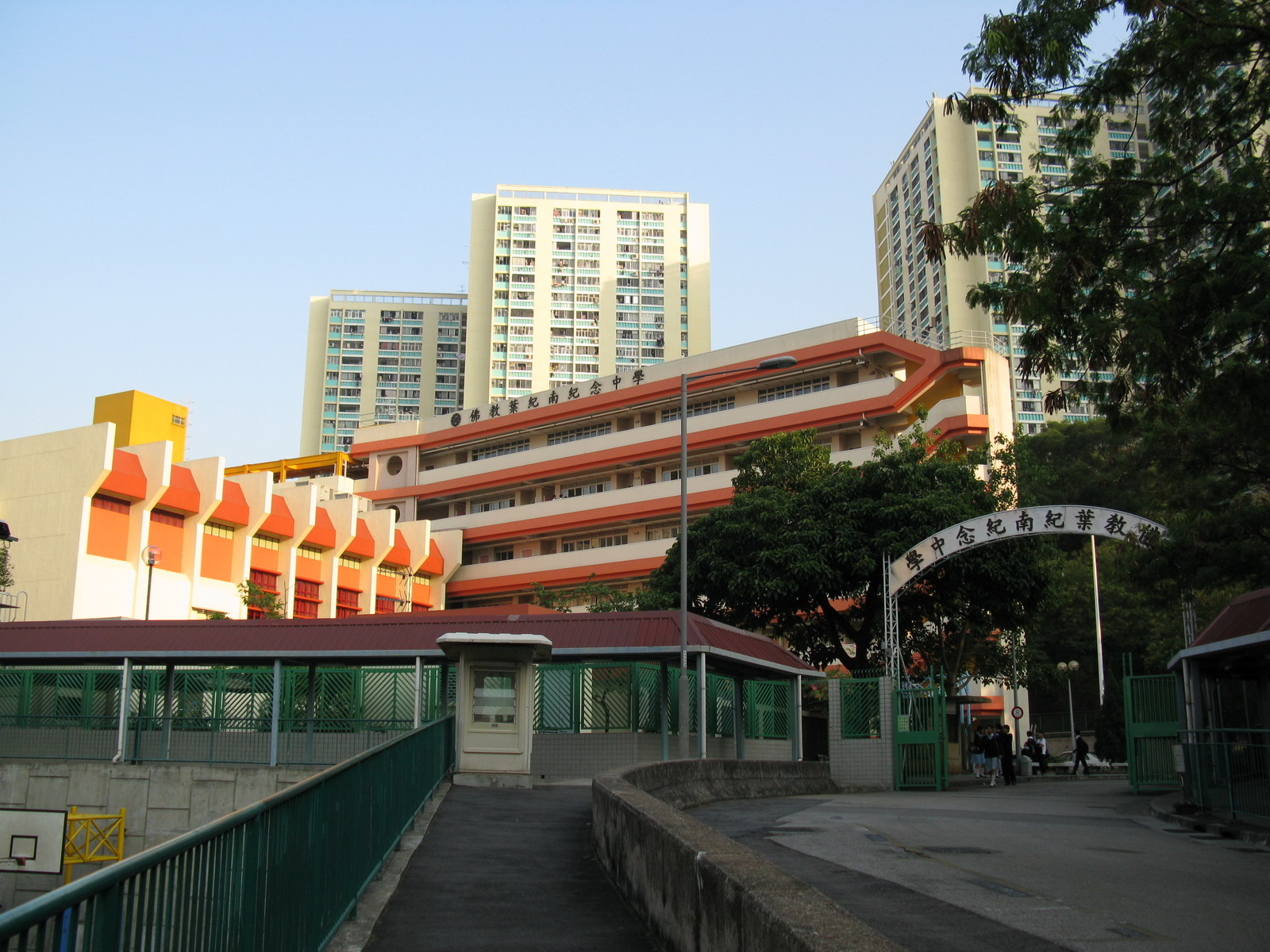
Buddhist Yip Kei Nam Memorial College

Buddhist Yip Kei Nam Memorial College (Chinese: 佛敎葉紀南紀念中學) is the first secondary school on Tsing Yi Island in the New Territories of Hong Kong. Located in Cheung Ching Estate, the school was founded by Hong Kong Buddhist Association in September 1978 with buildings from Hong Kong Government and funds from Yip Hon, a tycoon in Hong Kong and Macau. The school was named after Yip Hon's father, Yip Kei Nam (葉紀南).

The school is adjacent to Father Cucchiara Memorial School, Cheung Chi Cheong Memorial Primary School and Ching Yeung House in Cheung Ching Estate.
