= Tsing Yi Swimming Pool =

Swimming pool in Tsing Yi, Hong Kong

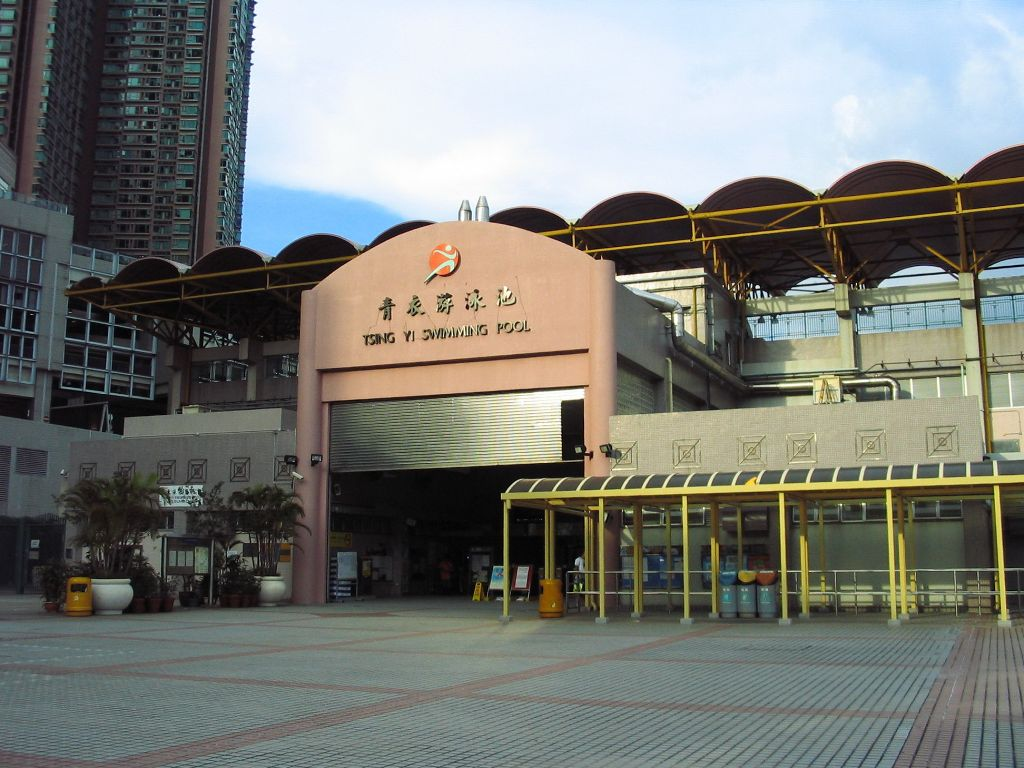
- Swimming pool entrance
- Interactive map of Tsing Yi Swimming Pool
- Location: 51 Tsing King Road, Tsing Yi, Hong Kong
- Coordinates: 22°21′26″N 114°06′28″E
- Operator: Leisure and Cultural Services Department
- Type: Open air

Construction
- Opened: 30 September 1996; 29 years ago

Website
- Official website

Tsing Yi Swimming Pool
- Chinese: 青衣游泳池
Transcriptions
Standard Mandarin
- Hanyu Pinyin: Qīngyī yóuyǒngchí
Yue: Cantonese
- Jyutping: cing1 ji1 jau4 wing6 ci4

Tsing Yi Swimming Pool (Chinese: 青衣游泳池) is a public swimming pool on Tsing Yi Island, New Territories, Hong Kong. It is near the east shore of the island, between Maritime Square and Tsing Yi Sports Ground. Currently, it is managed by the Leisure and Cultural Services Department of Hong Kong Government.

== History ==
The swimming pool was built and planned at the same time as the adjacent Tsing Yi Sports Ground. Both facilities were designed by the Architectural Services Department and planned by the former Regional Council. The site was also supposed to accommodate an indoor recreation centre, but it was thought that the development would be too cramped and so the centre was deleted from the plans in 1992.

The pool complex was designed with a capacity of 1,000 swimmers. It opened on 30 September 1996.

== Facilities ==
- Main pool (50 metres (160 ft))
- Teaching pool
- Leisure pool with water slides
- Spectator stand (covered, 974 seats)
