= Tsing Yi Nature Trail =

Hiking trail in Hong Kong

Coordinates: 22°21′27.99″N 114°5′46.3″E

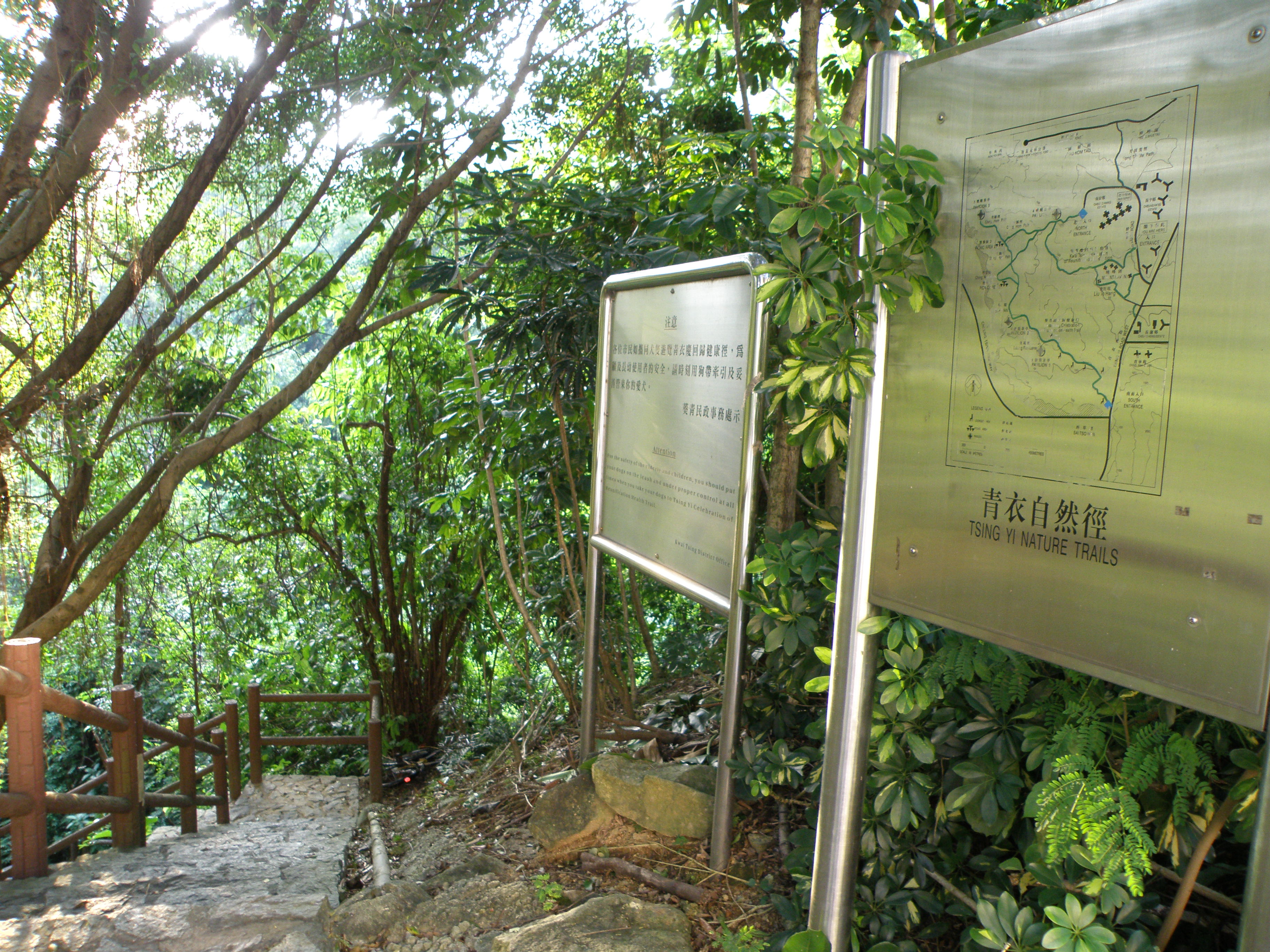
Signs at Tsing Yi Nature Trails

Tsing Yi Nature Trail (Chinese: 青衣自然徑), also known as Kwai Tsing Reunification Health Trail, is a hiking trail on Tsing Yi Island, New Territories, Hong Kong.

At the highest point, it has a view of Rambler Channel and Ma Wan Channel, with Ting Kau Bridge and Tsing Ma Bridge spanning over.
