= Tsing Yi Tong =

Former lagoon in Tsing Yi, Hong Kong

Coordinates: 22.3509°N 114.1076°E

- Chinese: 青衣塘
- Cantonese Yale: Chīngyītòhng
Transcriptions
Standard Mandarin
- Hanyu Pinyin: Qīngyītáng
- Wade–Giles: Ch‘ing^{1}-i^{1}-t‘ang^{2}
- IPA: [tɕʰíŋ.í.tʰǎŋ]
Hakka
- Pha̍k-fa-sṳ: Chhiâng-yî-thòng
Yue: Cantonese
- Yale Romanization: Chīngyītòhng
- Jyutping: cing1 ji1 tong4
- IPA: [tsʰɪŋ˥.ji˥.tʰɔŋ˩]

Tsing Yi Lagoon, or Tsing Yi Tong, was a lagoon on the east shore of Tsing Yi Island in Hong Kong. Its water came from a stream in the nearby valley of Liu To and its outlet was at Tsing Yi Bay. It acted as the shelter for nearby boat people, especially after large-scale land reclamation in Tsuen Wan and Kwai Chung. Once their boats moved into the lagoon, they never moved out. This was because their boats were too old for fishing far away. The lagoon was unable to escape the fate of development. Both the lagoon and the neighbouring Tsing Yi Bay, were reclaimed for new towns. The boat people were forced to give up their boats and were relocated to public housing estate on the island. After reclamation, the northern portion became Tsing Yi Estate and the remainder became temporary housing areas, which were later demolished.

== See also ==
- Pang uk
- Pillar Island
- Land reclamation in Hong Kong
