= Primary schools of Tung Wah Group of Hospitals in Tsing Yi =

Tung Wah Group of Hospitals has founded two primary schools on the Tsing Yi Island, i.e. Tung Wah Group of Hospitals Wong See Sum Primary School and Tung Wah Group of Hospitals Chow Yin Sum Primary School.

== Tung Wah Group of Hospitals Wong See Sum Primary School ==
Tung Wah Group of Hospitals Wong See Sum Primary School (Chinese: 東華三院黃士心小學) is a primary school in Cheung On Estate on the Tsing Yi Island of Hong Kong. The school opened on 1 September 1988.

The school building was improved in 1996 by Education Department.

In 2005, its afternoon school was moved Tsing Chin Street and renamed as Tung Wah Group of Hospitals Chow Yin Sum Primary School.

== Tung Wah Group of Hospitals Chow Yin Sum Primary School ==
Tung Wah Group of Hospitals Chow Yin Sum Primary School (Chinese: 東華三院周演森小學), also TWGHs Chow Yin Sum Primary School, is a primary school on the Tsing Yi Island of Hong Kong. The school was originally the afternoon school of Tung Wah Group of Hospitals Wong See Sum Primary School. As both morning and afternoon school became the whole day schools in 2005, the afternoon school was moved to the premises of closed Po Leung Kuk Tsing Yi Secondary School (Skill Opportunity) between Ching Hong Road and Tsing Chin Street and renamed to Chow Yin Sum Primary School.

In September 2006, as two primary schools, Cheung Chi Cheong Memorial Primary School and Chan Lai So Chun Memorial School, in Cheung Ching Estate will be closed, the pupils from both schools will be transferred to Chow Yin Sum Primary School to continue their studies.

== See also ==
- Tung Wah Group of Hospitals S. C. Gaw Memorial College on Tsing Yi Island
