= Tsing Yi Town =

Hong Kong town on the eastern coast of Tsing Yi Island

- Traditional Chinese: 青衣市
Transcriptions
Hakka
- Romanization: Ciang^{1} Yi^{1}si^{4}
Yue: Cantonese
- Jyutping: Cing1 ji1 si5

Tsing Yi Town (Chinese: 青衣市; Jyutping: cing1 ji1 si5) is located on the eastern coast of Tsing Yi Island, Hong Kong and is part of the Tsuen Wan New Town.

== See also ==
- Tsing Yi Hui
