= Tsing Yi =

Island in the New Territories, Hong Kong

青衣
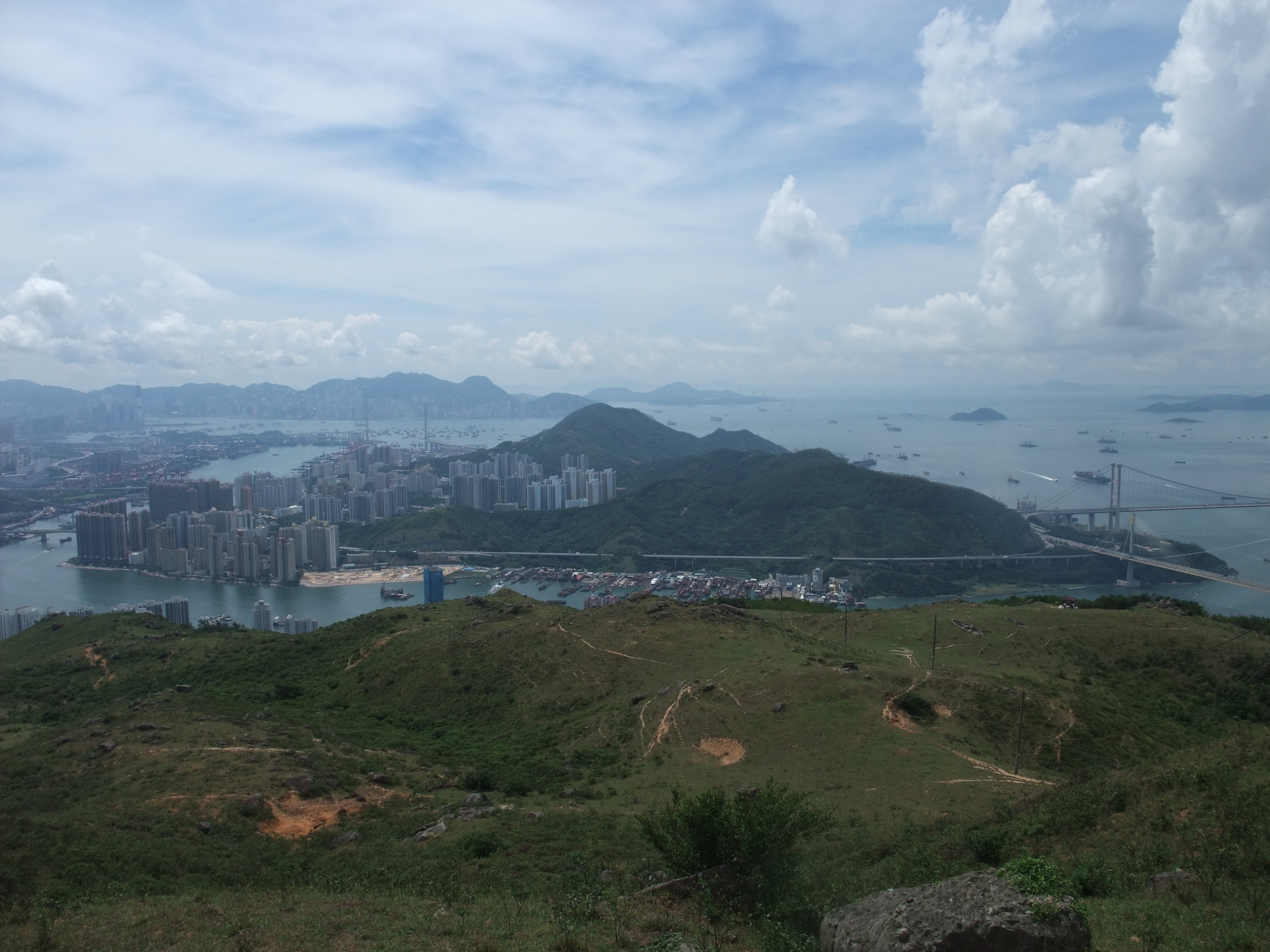
- Tsing Yi, viewed from Shek Lung Kung

- Location of Tsing Yi within Hong Kong

Geography
- Location: New Territories West
- Coordinates: 22°20′44″N 114°6′00″E
- Area: 10.69 km^{2} (4.13 sq mi)
- Length: 5.2 km (3.23 mi)
- Width: 4.5 km (2.8 mi)
- Highest elevation: 334 m (1096 ft)
- Highest point: Tsing Yi Peak (Sam Chi Heung)

Administration
- Hong Kong
- Districts: Kwai Tsing District

Demographics
- Population: 191,500

Tsing Yi
- Chinese: 青衣
Transcriptions
Standard Mandarin
- Hanyu Pinyin: Qīngyī
Yue: Cantonese
- Yale Romanization: Chīngyī
- Jyutping: Cing1ji1

Tsing Yi (Chinese: 青衣), sometimes referred to as Tsing Yi Island, is an island in the New Territories of Hong Kong, to the northwest of Hong Kong Island and south of Tsuen Wan. With an area of 10.69 km^{2} (4.13 sq mi), the island has been extended drastically by reclamation along almost all its natural shore and the annexation of Nga Ying Chau (牙鷹洲) and Chau Tsai. Three major bays or harbours, Tsing Yi Lagoon, Mun Tsai Tong, and Tsing Yi Bay (青衣灣) in the northeast, have been completely reclaimed for new towns.

The island is generally zoned into four quarters: the northeast quarter is a residential area, the southeast quarter is Tsing Yi Town, the southwest holds heavy industry, and the northwest includes a recreation trail, a transportation interchange and some dockyards and ship building industry. The island is in the northwest of Victoria Harbour and part of its coastline is subject to the Protection of the Harbour Ordinance.

== Etymology ==
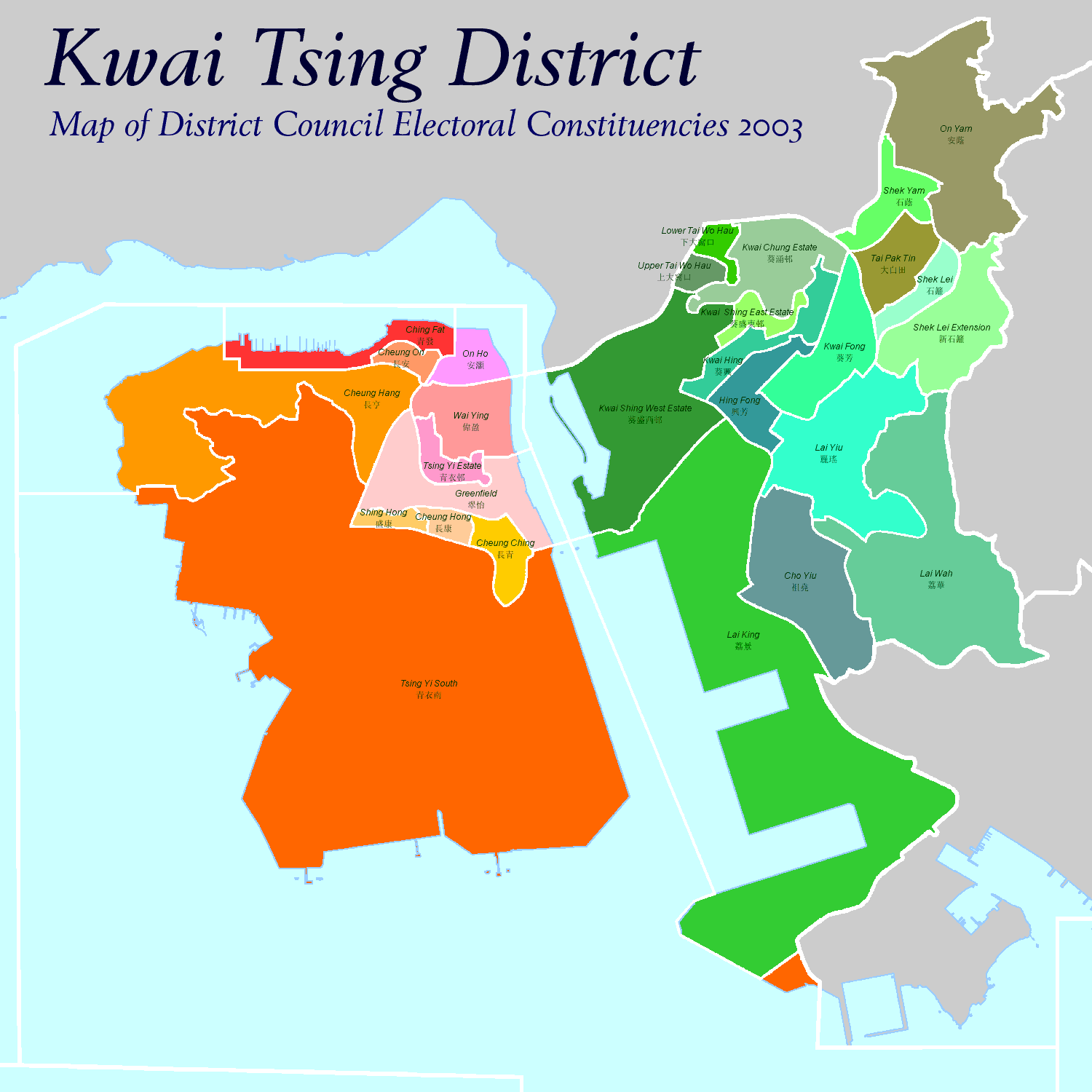
Constituencies in 2003 District Council Election. Tsing Yi Island is the island on the left.

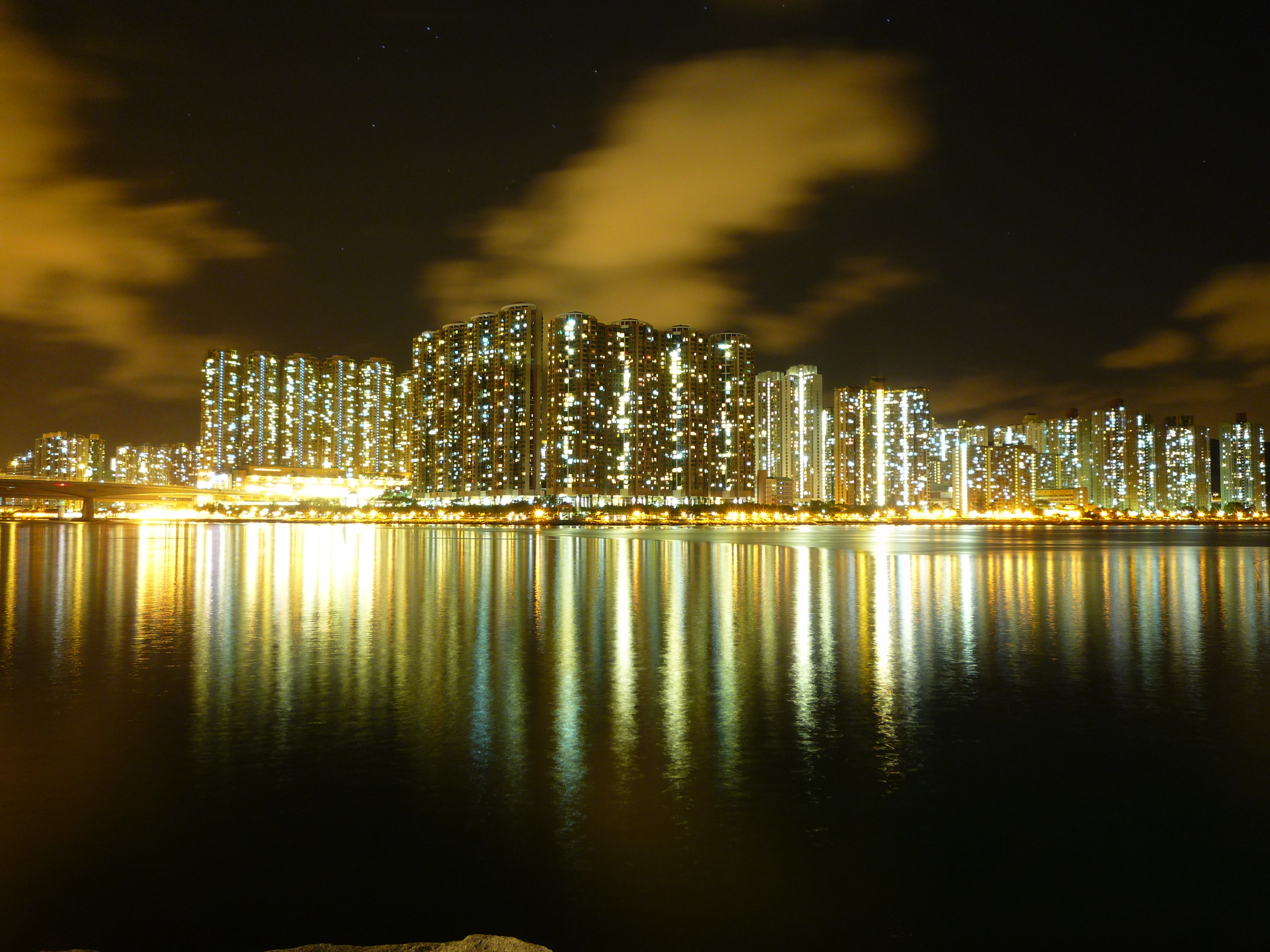
Ching Tai Court, Cheung Fat Estate and Ching Wang Court on the right, Villa Esplanada at the center, Maritime Square and Tsing Yi Bridge (North) on the left

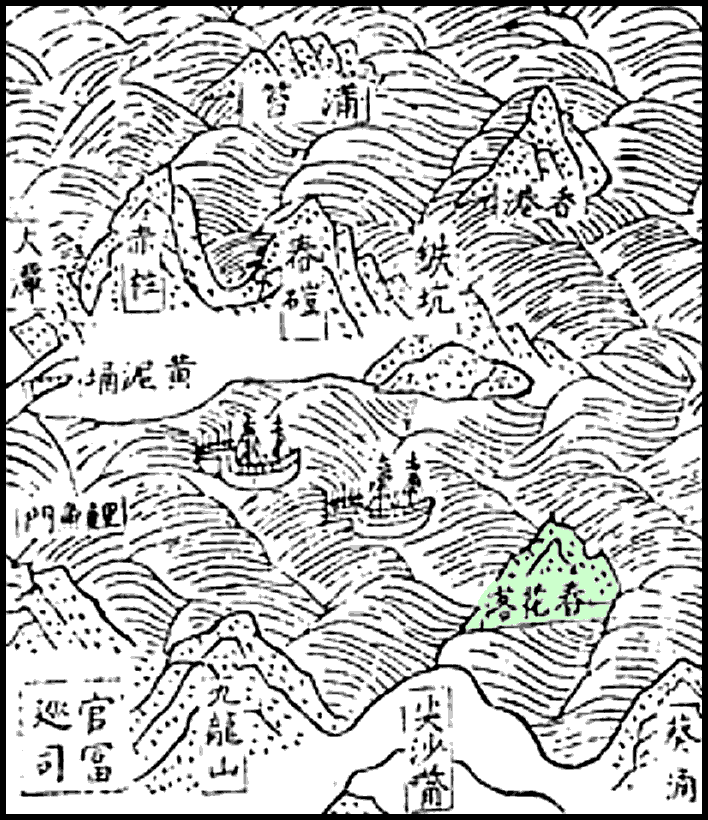
The position of Tsing Yi Island, as Chun Fa Lok (春花落), in the map of Yuet Tai Kei (粵大記) written by Kwok Fei (郭棐) during Ming Dynasty. (Note: The south is on the top of the map.)

Tsing Yi (青衣) literally means "green/ blue/ black clothes", but is also a kind of fish, most likely blackspot tuskfish, once abundant in nearby waters. People named the island after the fish. Tsing Yi Tam (青衣潭, Tsing Yi Deep Pool) or Tsing Yi Tam Shan (青衣潭山, Tsing Yi Deep Pool Hill) also appeared on some early Chinese maps.

The island was also once known as Chun Fa Lok (春花落), which means the fall of spring flowers, or Chun Fa Island, on some Western maps. Now, Chun Fa Lok is still a place name or a former village on the southeast corner of the island. A government document in the Ming Dynasty named the waters near Chun Fa Lok, Chun Fa Yeung (春花洋), which means the ocean of spring flowers. The Ming navy once defeated pirate fleets there.

In some historical sources, it is referred to as Tsing-I Island instead of Tsing Yi Island, and Chung-Hue Island instead of Chun Fa Island.

== Administration ==
Tsing Yi Town, together with Kwai Chung Town, is part of Tsuen Wan New Town in the Kwai Tsing District in the New Territories. Although Tsing Yi Island is a de facto outlying island, it is not accordingly included in the Islands District.

Historically, Tsing Yi Island, with Kwai Chung, were usually in the same administration unit as Tsuen Wan because of their proximity and close-knit neighbourhood. Unlike Kwai Chung, whose villages are part of Tsuen Wan Rural Committee, Tsing Yi Island has its own, Tsing Yi Rural Committee. The rural committee was politically significant until the establishment of a District Council and Regional Council (now-abolished), and even less significant since the urban population grew much larger than the rural population.

== Population ==
There were about 4,000 people on the island when the British took the New Territories around 1898. In the following one hundred years, the population has grown to nearly 50 times this size; the 2001 Census calculating that the population of the island was 193,432 in 55,478 households. In an estimation in 2007, there were about 200,400 people. It was expected to grow to 203,300 in the near future. Most of the population live in Tsing Yi Town.

== Geography ==
Tsing Yi Island is a hilly island with Tsing Yi Peak in the south and Liu To Shan in the north east. Small plain can be found surrounding the former Tsing Yi Lagoon in island northeast. The rocks on the island are mainly granite and were exposed due to extensive housing, industrial and infrastructure construction. Although the island is under the administration of the country park, most of the hilly area remains green. The Tsing Yi Peak climbs to 334 m (1,096 ft)and is a barrier separating industrial west and residential east.

Kam Chuk Kok is a cape on the west shore of Tsing Yi Island, Hong Kong. The shore was reclaimed for a Shell oil depot. The Chinese name of Kam Chuk Kok means the cape of golden bamboo.

Climate data for Tsing Yi (1998–2016)
Month	Jan	Feb	Mar	Apr	May	Jun	Jul	Aug	Sep	Oct	Nov	Dec	Year
Mean daily maximum °C (°F)	19.3 (66.7)	20.2 (68.4)	22.2 (72.0)	25.6 (78.1)	28.5 (83.3)	30.1 (86.2)	31.2 (88.2)	31.6 (88.9)	31.1 (88.0)	29.1 (84.4)	25.5 (77.9)	21.2 (70.2)	26.3 (79.3)
Daily mean °C (°F)	16.0 (60.8)	17.1 (62.8)	19.3 (66.7)	22.9 (73.2)	26.0 (78.8)	27.8 (82.0)	28.6 (83.5)	28.6 (83.5)	28.0 (82.4)	25.7 (78.3)	22.0 (71.6)	17.8 (64.0)	23.3 (73.9)
Mean daily minimum °C (°F)	13.6 (56.5)	14.9 (58.8)	17.2 (63.0)	20.9 (69.6)	24.0 (75.2)	25.9 (78.6)	26.5 (79.7)	26.4 (79.5)	25.8 (78.4)	23.6 (74.5)	19.7 (67.5)	15.3 (59.5)	21.2 (70.2)
Average precipitation mm (inches)	38.0 (1.50)	25.6 (1.01)	64.3 (2.53)	124.4 (4.90)	312.7 (12.31)	429.5 (16.91)	270.7 (10.66)	302.7 (11.92)	222.3 (8.75)	64.2 (2.53)	28.0 (1.10)	26.3 (1.04)	1,908.7 (75.15)
Average relative humidity (%)	67	75	76	80	81	82	79	78	73	67	68	63	73
Source: Hong Kong Observatory

== Nature ==
The hilly area of the island largely remains intact and is designated as a green belt. In 1997 a once lost endemic plant, Hong Kong croton, was found in the woodland beneath the highest peak, Tsing Yi Peak, on the island.

== History ==
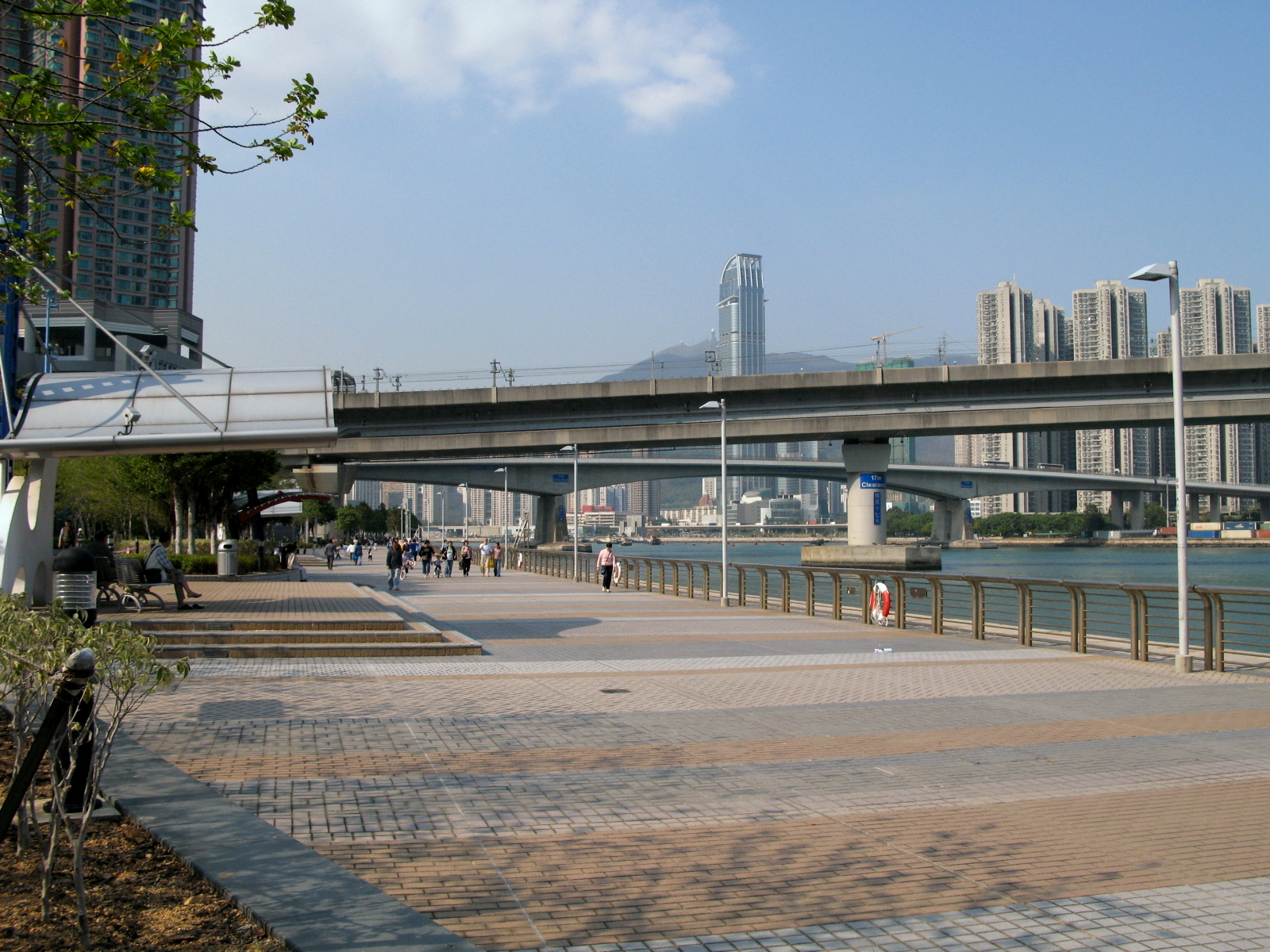
Tsing Yi Promenade in Tsing Yi Town along Rambler Channel

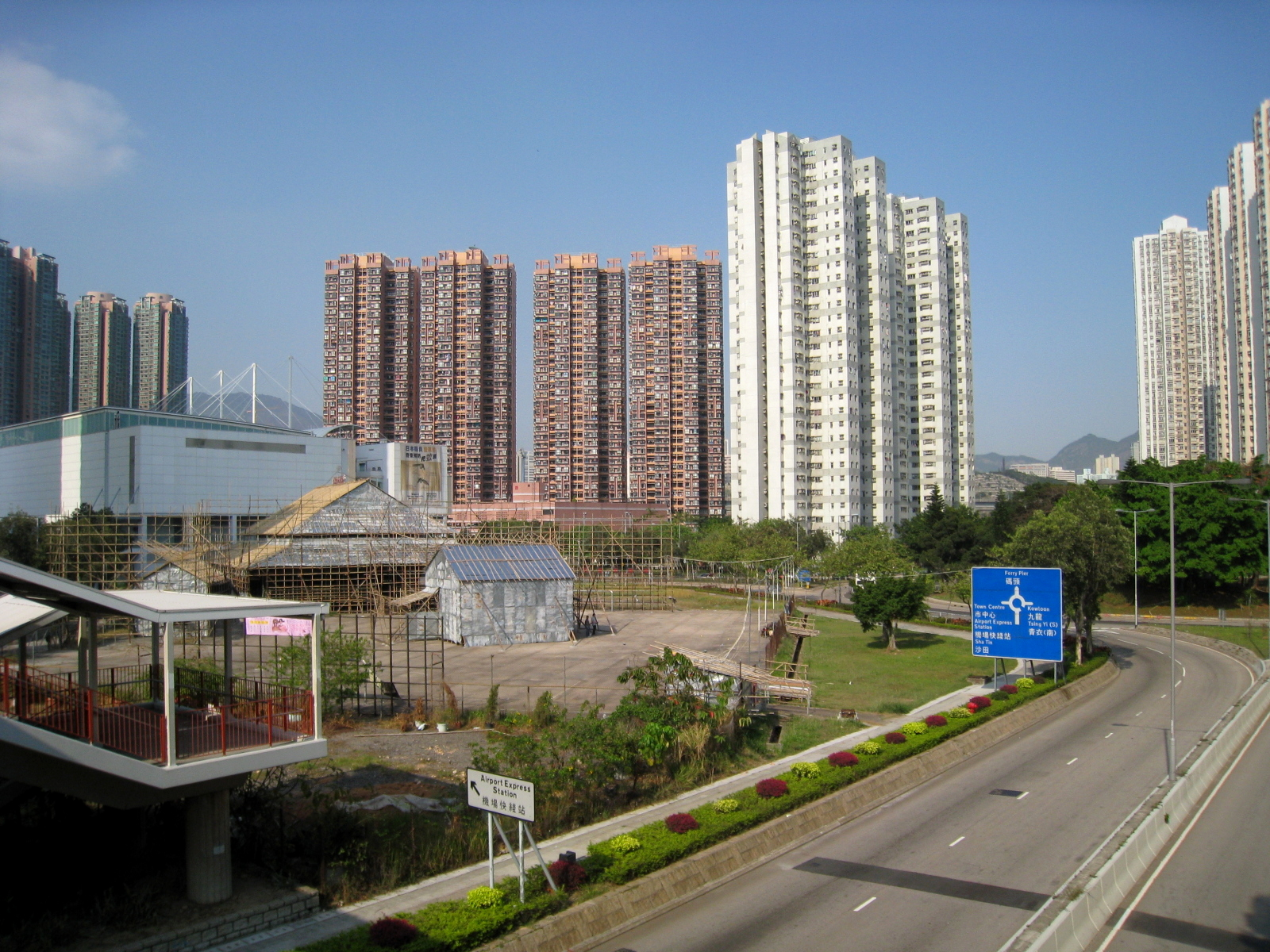
Residential buildings in Tsing Yi

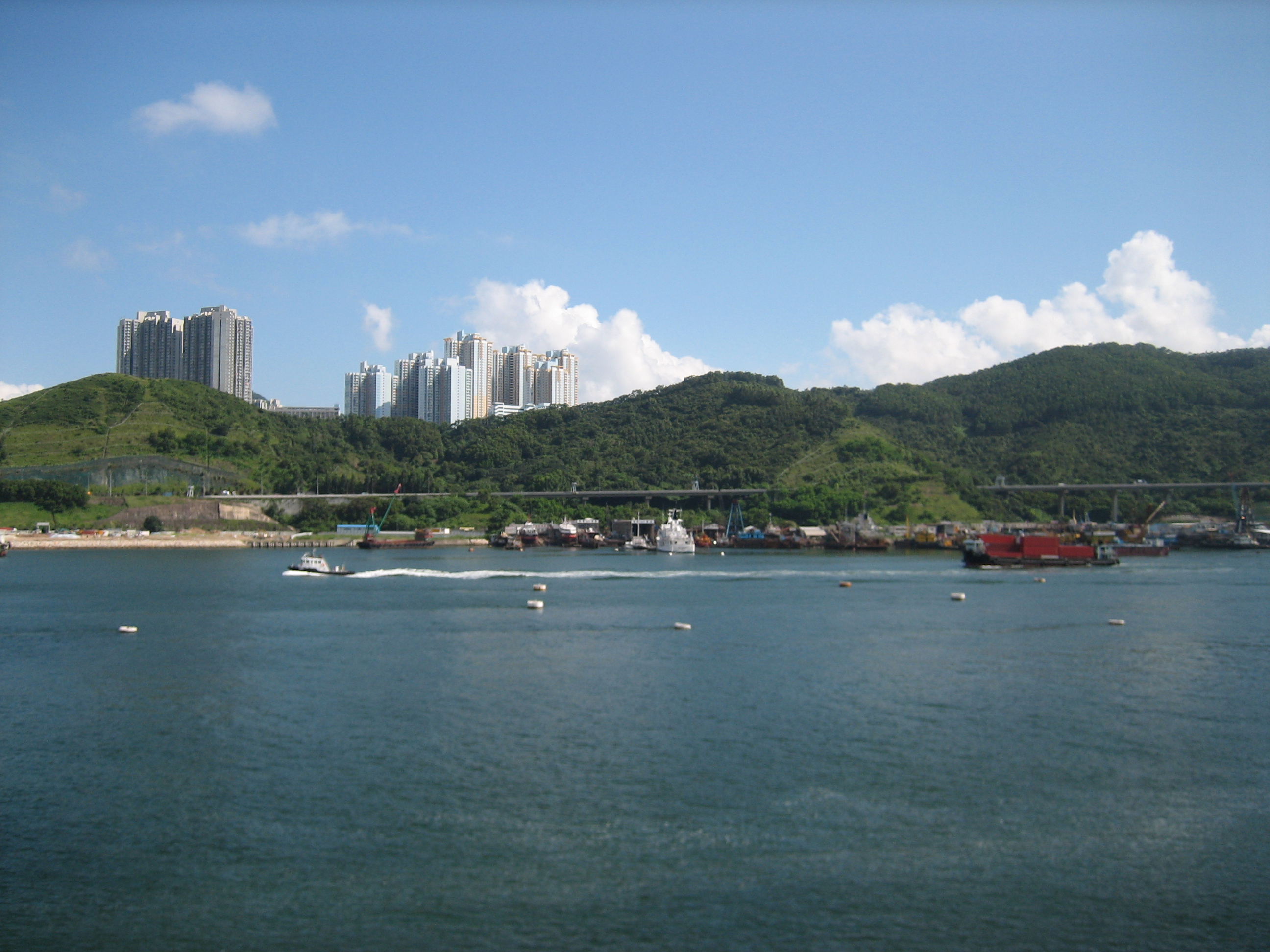
Tsing Yi North Coastal

In the early days, the inhabitants on the island were mostly farmers and fishermen. The major population concentrated in the northeast portion of the island. Farmers grew rice, vegetables and pineapples, while fishermen lived in huts connected by plank walkways in the small harbour of Tsing Yi Tong which stretched far back into the island. Many fishermen also lived on their junks and boats all the time, fishing in the nearby waters. Even as late as the 1970s, Tsing Yi Tong resembled Tai O with its characteristic stilt houses and water vehicles. Like many other fishing villages in Hong Kong, the Tsing Yi dwellers worshipped Tin Hau, the goddess of mercy and the sea. A Tin Hau Temple was built on the shore of Tsing Yi Tong. At the birthday of Tin Hau, fishermen of all nearby waters would come to the Temple for celebrations. The temple was white in color and thus people call it Pak Miu (白廟, lit. 'White Temple').

From the 1920s onwards, a Chinese company built lime factories on the present site of Greenfield Garden. It is the earliest known industry on the island. The lime industry continued to flourish during the 1950s, and a tanning factory was also founded at the same period. After World War II, other heavy industries moved in as well. In the 1960s, several oil companies moved their oil storage depots onto the island and a Green Island Cement cement plant. CLP later commissioned its 1520MW oil-fired Tsing Yi Power Station in 1969 at Nam Wan due to its proximity to the oil tank farms. Meanwhile, some small shipbuilding companies opened on Tsing Yi, and remain on the north side of the island. In the 1970s, six large-scale companies on the island collectively built the Tsing Yi Bridge to connect Tsing Yi Town and Kwai Chung Town over the Rambler Channel. The bridge was soon transferred to the Hong Kong Government, remaining the sole road connection to the island for more than ten years. Several industrial buildings for light industries were constructed beside the bridge afterward. Several dockyards moved to the west shore of the island at the end of the 1970s.

During the 1950s, Wok Tai Wan on Tsing Yi Island was a paradise for nudists, and hence Tsing Yi was once synonymous with nudism in Hong Kong.

After the establishment of the Tsing Yi Bridge, the Hong Kong government commenced an extensive new town project on the island. Cheung Ching Estate, Cheung Hong Estate and Mayfair Gardens were consequently built in heaps. The vicinity of the Mobil oil storage depot to Mayfair Garden and Cheung Ching Estate once aroused enormous concern for the safety of the residents. Some social workers and residents urged the government to relocate the storage facilities. The government decided to halt the last phase of the Mayfair Garden development scheme. The storage facility remained at the same location until Container Terminal 9 was on the government's agenda.

Later on, the tenor of town development shifted northward. Two fisherman harbours, Tsing Yi Tong and Mun Tsai Tong were reclaimed for residential use. Many fishermen were relocated from their boats parked in the typhoon shelter to the Ching Tao House, a new residential block on land, of Chueng Ching Estate. The land inhabitants were put together into several designated areas so as to re-build their villages. The primary sectors had all died out owing to the drastic town development. Tsing Yi Estate, Cheung On Estate, Cheung Fat Estate, Ching Tai Court and Tsing Yi Garden were built after all reclamations were accomplished. Ching Wah Court was built adjoining to Cheung Hong Estate. At the same time, Tsing Yi Bridge was seriously overburdened and its structure was unable to cope with increasing traffic. There was only a one-way road in each direction on the bridge. Traffic congestion became the burning problem in the community, and subsequently fueled protest. Finally, Tsing Yi North Bridge, a connection to Tsuen Wan town was built to ease off the congestion, as well as to accommodate the local residential population boom.

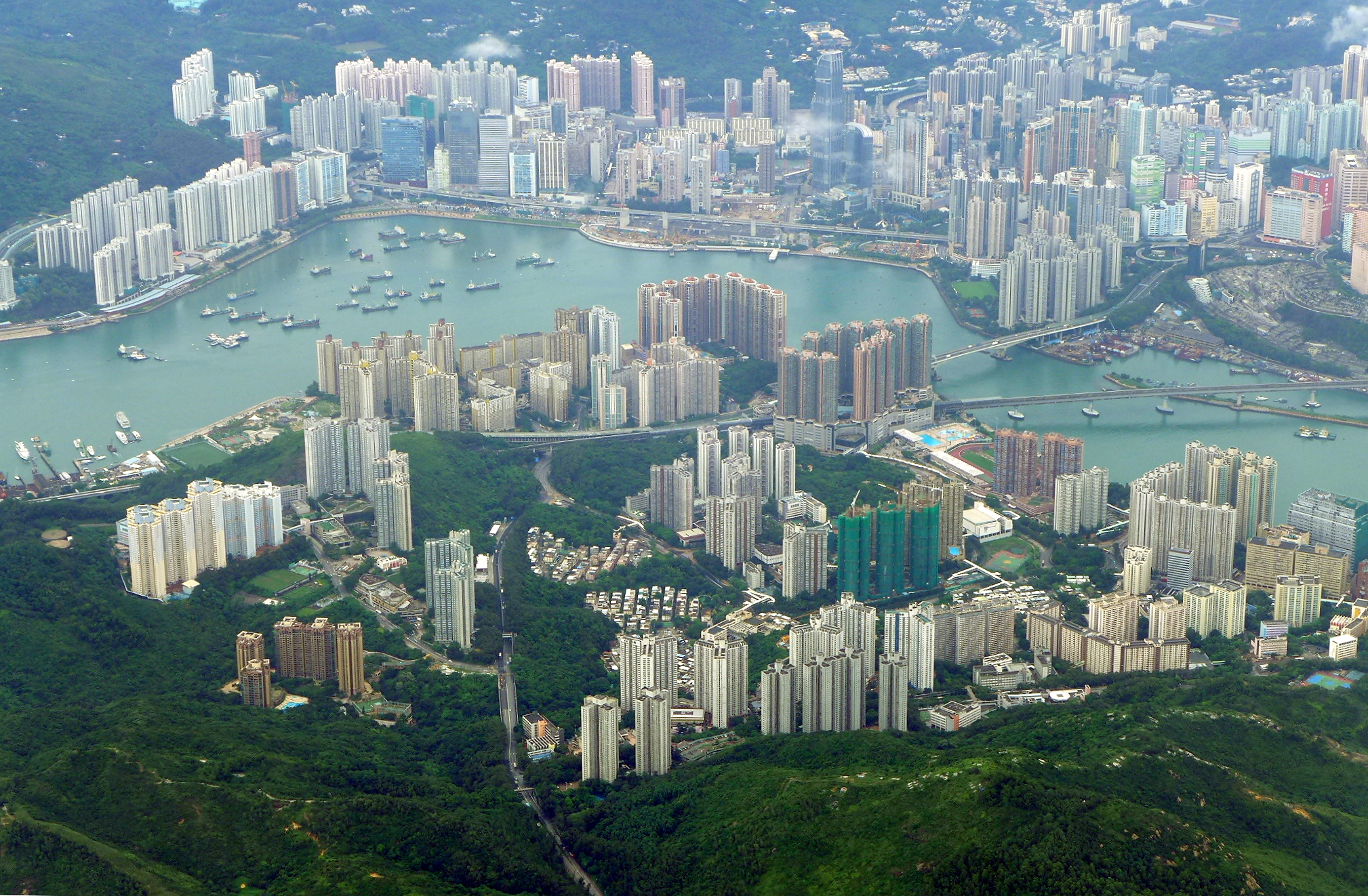
Clusters of highrise residential blocks in Tsing Yi Town

Tsing Yi was continually under further development and Greenfield Garden, Serene Garden, Broadview Garden, and Cheung Hang Estate were constructed.

The final decision to relocate Hong Kong International Airport spurred a new series of development: Airport Railway, Ting Kau Bridge to Ting Kau and North New Territories, Tsing Ma Bridge to Ma Wan and Lantau Island, Rambler Channel Bridge to Kowloon and Hong Kong Island, Duplicate Tsing Yi South Bridge on the south side of Tsing Yi Bridge. On the island, new residential projects, Tivoli Garden, Grand Horizon, Mount Haven, Villa Esplanada, Tierra Verde, and Cheung Wang Estate were completed. The final part of reclaimed land near the shore had been laid waste for almost a decade until Tsing Yi Promenade was built in 2004. Local Hong Kong cultural pursuits of Chinese music and dancing, walking and Chinese exercise are in evidence in most evenings.

From 2000 to 2004, Container Terminal 9 was built on the reclaimed southwest shore of the island, together with resident blocks, Rambler Crest. Nearby, and well within sight of Central, Victoria, a controversial new dioxin burning plant was also put into operation during 2004, arousing much concern for the residents of Tsing Yi and Hong Kong island.

== Local product ==
Since 2018, Tsing Yi hosts its very own local craft beer brewery - H.K. Lovecraft, making craft lager instead of craft ale.

== Housing estates and villages ==
=== Public housing ===
Name		Type	Inaug.	No Blocks	No Units Remained for Rent	Associated developments
Cheung Ching Estate	長青邨	Public	1977	8	4,905	
Cheung Fat Estate	長發邨	Public	1989	4	2,067	Cheung Fat Estate Shopping Centre
Cheung Hang Estate	長亨邨	Public	1990	6	4,689	
Cheung Hong Estate	長康邨	Public	1979	13	8,100	
Cheung On Estate	長安邨	Semi-Private	1988	10	7,338	Cheung On Bus Terminal
Cheung Wang Estate	長宏邨	Public	2001	7	4,273	
Easeful Court	青逸軒	Public	2003	2	510	
Tsing Yi Estate	青衣邨	Public	1986	4	930	

=== HOS/PSPS/Sandwich Class Scheme housing ===
Name		Type	Inaug.	No Blocks	No Units	Associated developments
Ching Nga Court	青雅苑	HOS	1989	1	816	
Ching Shing Court	青盛苑	HOS	1985	1	800	
Ching Tai Court	青泰苑	HOS	1988	7	2,180	
Ching Wah Court	青華苑	HOS	1986	6	2,460	
Ching Wang Court	青宏苑	HOS	2001	2	576	
Serene Garden	海悅花園	PSPS	1992	3	840	
Tivoli Garden	宏福花園	Sandwich	1995	4	1024	
Greenview Villa	綠悠雅苑	MHPP	2015	3	988	
Ching Chun Court	青俊苑	HOS	2017	2	465	

=== Private housing ===
Name		Type	Inaug.	No Blocks	No Units	Associated developments	Developer
Broadview Garden	偉景花園	Semi-Private		7	1776		HK Housing Society
Grand Horizon	海欣花園	Private	2000	5	1,432		Sun Hung Kai
Greenfield Garden	翠怡花園	Private	1989	11	3,216	Mall	Sun Hung Kai
Mayfair Gardens	美景花園	Private	1977	8	1912		Sun Hung Kai
Mount Haven	曉峰園	Private	1999	5	816		Sun Hung Kai
Rambler Crest	藍澄灣	Private		5	1560	Mall and hotels	Hutchison Whampoa
Villa Esplanada	灝景灣	Private	1997	10	2824		Consortium
Tierra Verde	盈翠半島	Private		12	3700	Maritime Square, Tsing Yi MTR	MTR Corp, Hutchison
Tsing Yi Garden	青怡花園	Private	1986	7	1,520	podium arcade	Cheung Kong

=== Villages ===
- Chung Mei Lo Uk Village (涌美老屋村)
- Fishermen's Village (漁民村)
- Fung Shue Wo Resite Village (楓樹窩新村)
- Lam Tin Resite Village (藍田村)
- St. Paul's Village (聖保祿村)
- Sun Uk Resite Village (新屋村)
- Tai Wong Ha Resite Village (大王下村)
- Tsing Yi Hui (青衣墟)
- Tsing Yi Lutheran Village
- Tsing Yu Resite Village (青裕新村)
- Yim Tin Kok Resite (鹽田角村)
- Sai Shan Village

== Hotels ==
There are three hotels in Tsing Yi Town, at the east of Tsing Yi Island, facing the marvellous view of Rambler Channel and the container terminals. They are:

- Mexan Harbour Hotel,
- Rambler Garden Hotel and
- Rambler Oasis Hotel.

== Transport ==
Tsing Yi Island is a transportation hub in Hong Kong.

=== Bridges ===
Eight bridges connect to the island.

- Tsing Yi Bridge to Kwai Chung Town and Kowloon.
- Kwai Tsing Bridge (Duplicate Tsing Yi South Bridge) to Kwai Chung Town and Kowloon.
- Tsing Tsuen Bridge (Tsing Yi North Bridge) to Tsuen Wan Town.
- Ting Kau Bridge to Tuen Mun Town and Yuen Long Town (Route 3).
- Cheung Tsing Bridge to Kowloon and Hong Kong Island (Route 3).
- Tsing Ma Bridge to Ma Wan and Lantau Island (Route 8).
- Tsing Lai Bridge to Lai King station (dedicated MTR viaduct)
- Stonecutters Bridge to Stonecutters Island, Kowloon and Sha Tin Town (Route 8).

Within the island:

- Liu To Bridge (a part of Tsing Yi West Road)

=== Tunnels ===
- Cheung Tsing Tunnel (Route 3)
- Nam Wan Tunnel (Route 8)

=== Railway ===
Tsing Yi station, at the northeastern part of Tsing Yi Island, in Tsing Yi Town, is served by MTR Tung Chung line and Airport Express. It is also the only rail station on the island.

=== Bus transport ===
Tsing Yi is served by an extensive bus network, with routes terminating at different parts of Hong Kong.

There are 9 bus termini on the island:

- Cheung Ching (長青)
- Cheung Hang (長亨)
- Cheung Hong (長康)
- Cheung On (長安)
- Cheung Wang (長宏), formerly known as "Tsing Yan" (青欣)
- Mayfair Gardens (美景花園)
- Tsing Yi station (青衣站)
- Tsing Yi Estate (青衣邨)
- Tsing Yi Ferry (青衣碼頭)

=== Pier ===
Before the completion of Tsing Yi Bridge, ferry was the only public transport to mainland Hong Kong. Tsing Yi Pier was built near Tsing Yi Town before the reclamation. The pier followed the change of shoreline owing after reclamation, and moved to the waterfront near Greenfield Garden.

Hovercraft service between Tsuen Wan, Tsing Yi and Central was provided by the former Hongkong and Yaumati Ferry. After the franchise of the company came to an end, Hong Kong and Kowloon Ferry took over the route and operated it.

All ferry services ceased with rapid development of road and rail transport, especially MTR Tung Chung line with its station just a few hundred metres away from the ferry pier. It no longer takes residents to Tsuen Wan and Central. The pier is now open to the public, and continues to be used as a drop-off point for fishermen and tourists, and as a mooring site for government boats.

== Religious buildings ==
- Tin Hau Temple (青衣天后古廟); the temple was originally located near Tsing Yi Tong. Upon reclamation of Tsing Yi, it was moved to Ha Ko Tan (下高灘), near today's Chung Mei Lo Uk Village.
- Chun Kwan Temple (真君廟); dedicated to Chun Kwan. The temple was relocated near Tsing Yi Police Station.
- Tsing Tak Tong Tat-more Temple (清德堂達摩廟); the Bodhidharma temple in Tsing Yi Lutheran Village.
- Tai Wong Temple (大王古廟), Taoist temple in Tsing Yi Lutheran Village.
- Tai Yam Neong Neong Temple (太陰娘娘廟); Taoist temple, dedicated to the Lunar Goddess, Sheung Ngo (嫦娥), located in Tsing Yi Lutheran Village.
- St. Thomas the Apostle Church; the Catholic church building, near Tsing Yi Estate and Tsing Yi Park, was completed in July 1999.
- Tsing Yi Ward of the Church of Jesus Christ of Latter-day Saints (LDS Church); The church is near Maritime Square and St. Pauls Village.
- Tsing Lam Church (青霖堂), Protestant church by the side of Fishermen's Village and St. Paul's Village; the buildings were formally "Fish Marketing Organisation Tsing Yi Fishermen's Children's Primary School".

== Education ==
In the early days, education on the Tsing Yi Island was mostly private. The first public school on the island is Tsing Yi Public School, a primary school founded by villagers and businessmen on the island. In the post-World War II era, Hong Kong Government provides 9-year free education to all children from primary one to secondary three. The public school is then mainly funded by the government. Another school for the children of fishermen, Tsing Yi Fishermen's Children's Primary School, was founded by Fish Marketing Organisation. In 1977, Cheung Ching Estate, the first public housing estates on the island, marked the beginning of the new town on the island. To accommodate new schooling children, three primary schools and Buddhist Yip Kei Nam Memorial College, the first secondary school on the island, were built with the estate. More schools were erected when new estates were completed. In 1999, a post-secondary college, Hong Kong Technical College (Tsing Yi), was completed and provides vocational training for all adults in Hong Kong. In the 2000s, the number of schooling children began to drop and the several schools are facing the fatal fate.

All of Tsing Yi is in Primary One Admission (POA) School Net 66. Within the school net are multiple aided schools (operated independently but funded with government money); no government schools are in this net.

Numerous schools are founded on Tsing Yi Island, namely:

=== Primary schools ===
- CNEC Lui Ming Choi Primary School
- Father Cucchiara Memorial School
- HKCSCA Cheung Chi Cheong Memorial Primary School
- HKSYIC&IA Chan Lai So Chun Memorial School
- Delia (Man Kiu) English Primary School
- PLK Castar Primary School
- PLK Chan Yat Primary School
- SKH Ho Chak Wan Primary School
- SKH Tsing Yi Estate Ho Chak Wan Primary School
- SKH Tsing Yi Chu Yan Primary School
- Tsing Yi Public School
- Tsing Yi Fishermen's Children's Primary School (closed)
- Tsing Yi Trade Association Primary School
- Tsuen Wan Trade Association Primary School
- TWGHs Chow Yin Sum Primary School
- TWGHs Wong See Sum Primary School
- YCH Chiu Tsang Hok Wan Primary School

=== Secondary schools ===
- Buddhist Yip Kei Nam Memorial College
- Caritas St. Joseph Secondary School
- CCC Yenching College
- Lok Sin Tong Leung Chik Wai Memorial School
- PLK Tsing Yi Secondary School (Skill Opportunity) (closed)
- Po Leung Kuk Lo Kit Sing (1983) College
- Queen's College Old Boys' Association Secondary School
- S. C. Gaw Memorial College

=== Special schools ===
- PLK Mr. and Mrs. Chan Pak Keung Tsing Yi School

=== Institute of Vocational Education ===
- Hong Kong Institute of Vocational Education (Tsing Yi)

=== Public libraries ===
Hong Kong Public Libraries maintains the Tsing Yi Public Library in the Tsing Yi Municipal Services Building.

== Medical services ==
The Department of Health operates two general out-patient clinics on the island in Tsing Yi Town. The first one is Tsing Yi Cheung Hong Clinic in Cheung Hong Estate and another is Tsing Yi Town Clinic near Tsing Yi Garden. There is also one maternal and child health centre, Tsing Yi Maternal and Child Health Centre, on the island. It is just next to Tsing Yi Cheung Hong Clinic.

There is at least one private clinic in each housing estate.

In town planning, Tsing Yi Hospital was supposed to be built near Cheung Hang Estate but the plan was put off owing to financial difficulty of Hospital Authority.

== Shopping ==
All public and private housing estates on the island have their own shopping centres or markets. Cheung Fat Shopping Centre, by Hong Kong Housing Authority was once the largest shopping centre and was later supplanted by MTR Corporation's Maritime Square, as the shopping focus of the island.

== Economy ==
Tsing Yi is home to Hong Kong United Dockyard, located on the west side since 1980.

Sai Tso Wan (茜草灣) or (西草灣) is an industrial area and former bay in the west shore near the centre of Tsing Yi Island, Hong Kong. The bay has several heavy industry facilities, such oil storages and docks.

== Leisure facilities ==
- Tsing Yi Swimming Pool
- Tsing Yi Sports Ground
- Fung Shue Wo Indoor Recreation Centre
- Tsing Yi Indoor Recreation Centre
- Cheung Fat Indoor Recreation Centre
- Tsing Yi Public Library
- Tsing Yi Park
- Tsing Yi Nature Trail
- Tsing Yi Promenade

People practise tai chi in Tsing Yi Promenade near Maritime Square in Tsing Yi Town in the early morning hours. Some gather and practise dancing in the playground near Tsing Yung House of Cheung Ching Estate.

== See also ==
- Tsing Yi Bamboo Theatre
- List of islands and peninsulas of Hong Kong
- Kam Chuk Kok
- List of places in Hong Kong
- Tsing Yi Rural Committee
- My Home Purchase Plan
