= Maritime Square =

Shopping centre in Tsing Yi, Hong Kong

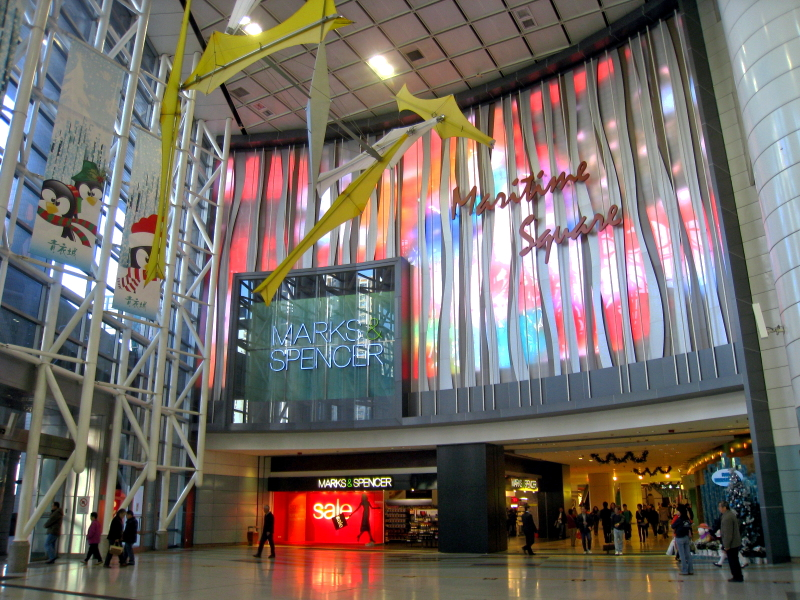
- Maritime Square entrance before renovation
- Location: Tsing Yi Island, Hong Kong
- Coordinates: 22.3557°N 114.1082°E
- Address: 33 Tsing King Road (Phase 1); 31 Tsing King Road (Phase 2)
- Opened: 1 April 1999; 27 years ago (Phase 1), 16 December 2017; 8 years ago (Phase 2)
- Developer: MTR Corporation Limited
- Manager: MTR Properties Management
- Num. of stores: 140
- Floor area: 46,000 m^{2} (500,000 sq ft)
- Floors: 4
- Public transit: Tsing Yi station

Maritime Square
- Chinese: 青衣城
- Literal meaning: Tsing Yi City
Transcriptions
Standard Mandarin
- Hanyu Pinyin: Qīngyī chéng
- Wade–Giles: Ch‘ing^{1}-i^{1} ch‘êng^{2}
- IPA: [tɕʰíŋ.í ʈʂʰə̌ŋ]
Yue: Cantonese
- Yale Romanization: Chīngyī sìhng
- Jyutping: cing1 ji1 sing4
- IPA: [tsʰɪŋ˥.ji˥ sɪŋ˩]

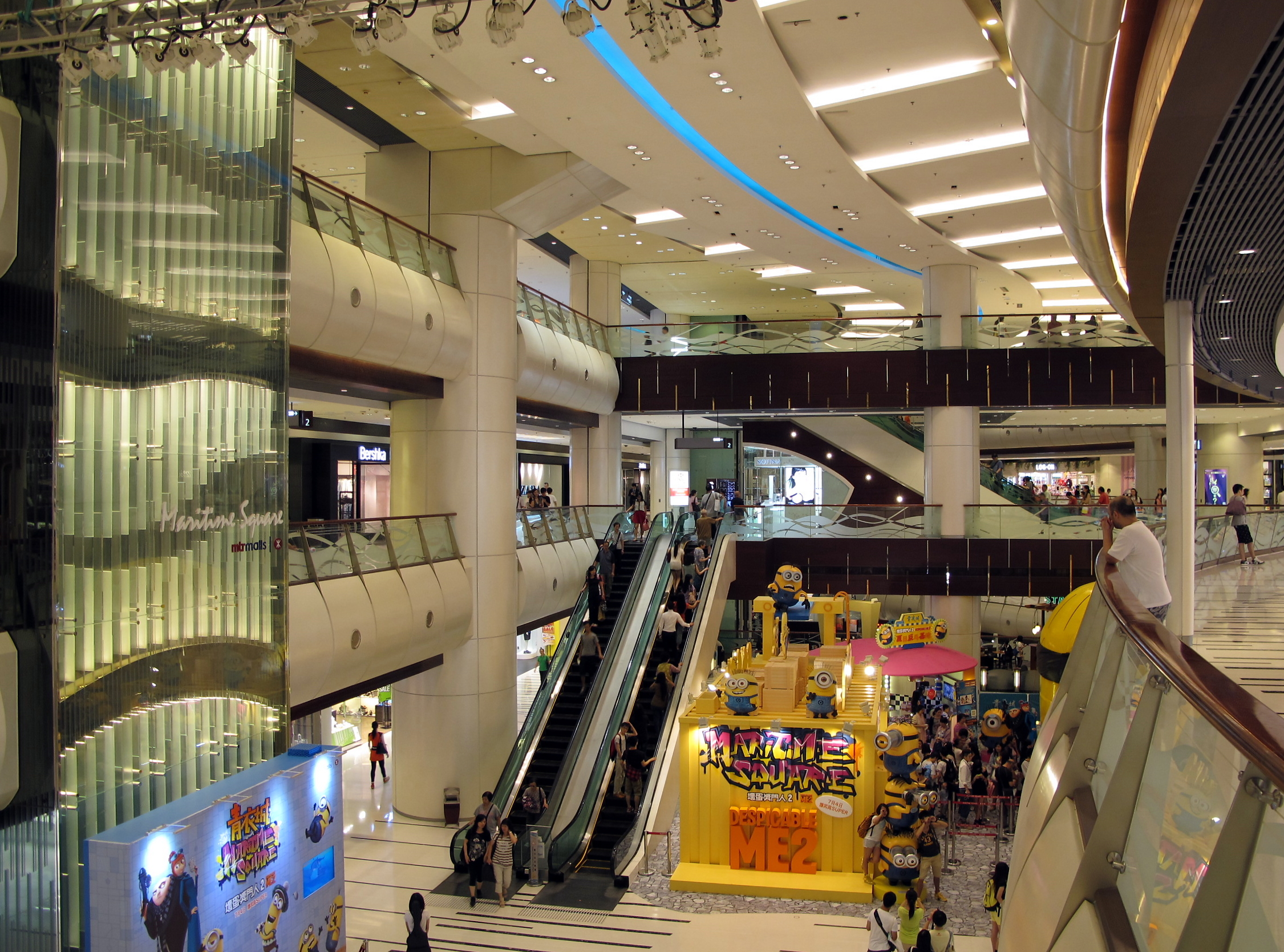
Atrium of Maritime Square

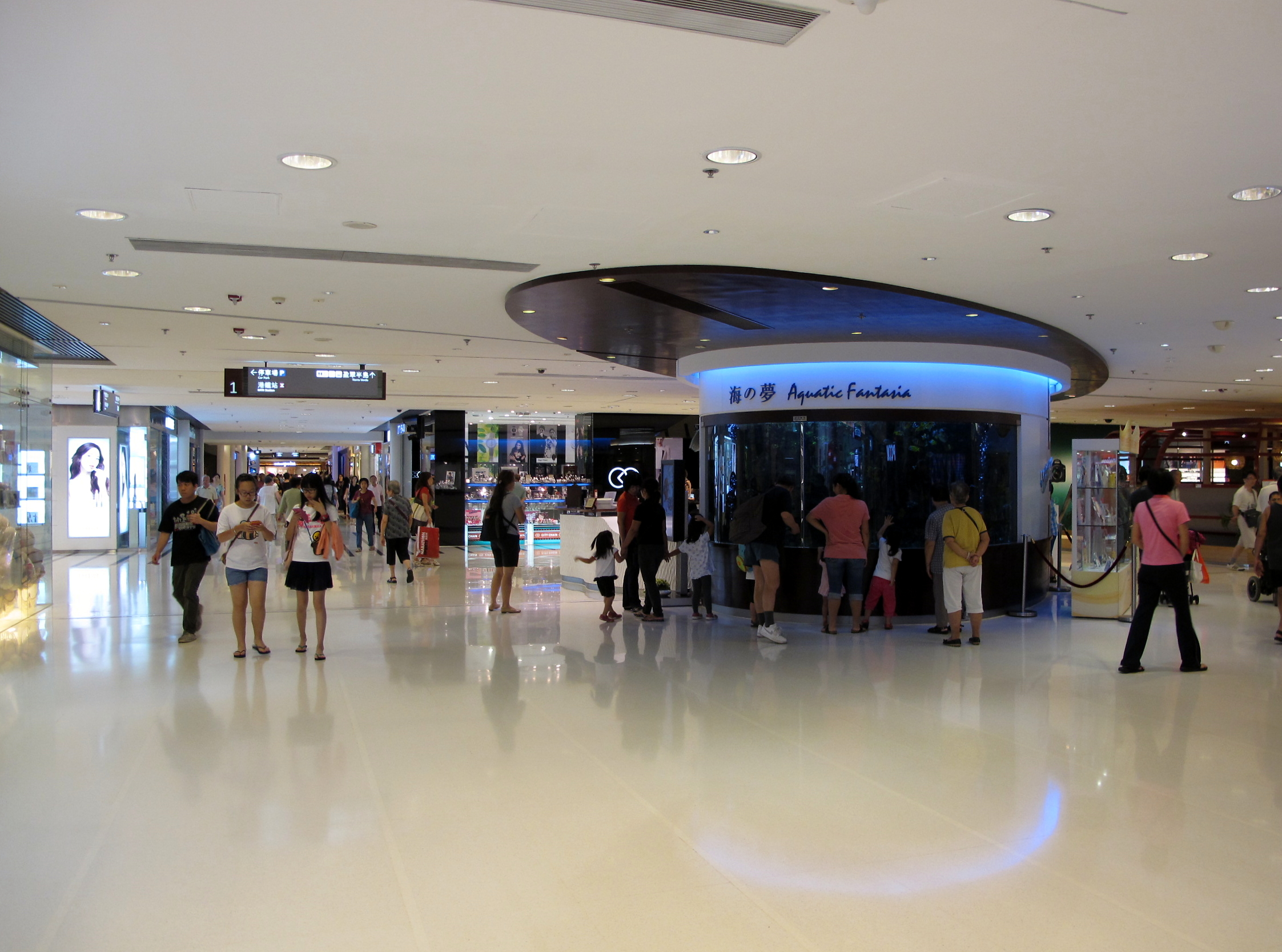
Aquatic Fantaria inside the mall

Maritime Square (Chinese: 青衣城; Cantonese Yale: Chīngyī sìhng) is a four-storey shopping centre located on Tsing Yi Island in the New Territories of Hong Kong. It was built and is owned by MTR Corporation (MTRC) in conjunction with the opening of Tsing Yi station.

== History ==
The shopping centre opened on 1 April 1999 and has a floor area of 46,000 square metres (500,000 sq ft). The landlords claimed in December 2004 that daily pedestrian traffic at the mall is 170,000.

MTR expanded the shopping centre onto the site of the Tsing Yi lorry park. Some opposed the plan because it blocks the already crowded skyline. The MTR broke ground on the $2.4 billion project in 2015, and work was completed in 2017.

== Design ==
Maritime Square is the first shopping mall in Hong Kong adopting ocean and navigation as the design theme.

== Shops ==
Maritime Square houses a total of 140 shops. There are a wide variety of restaurants, bookstores, fashion stores, electrical appliances stores, supermarket, cinema and banks, etc. Numerous types of restaurants are available. For example, fast food restaurants like Café de Coral, traditional Chinese restaurants, cafés like Starbucks and restaurants providing Japanese and Thai food. There is also a Hong Kong Jockey Centre, which is the first off-course betting branch of the Hong Kong Jockey Club to be opened on the island.

== Facilities ==
The following various customer services are available at the Customer Service Centres:

- Enquiries on mall promotional activities and transportation information
- Wheelchair lending (within the mall area only)
- Baby stroller lending (within the mall area only and limited supply)
- Emergency mobile phone battery charging
- Disposable raincoat
- Umbrella lending (limited supply)
- Lost child handling and lost & found service
- Octopus card add-value service
