= Cheung Shue Tau =

Place on Tsing Yi Island, Hong Kong

Cheung Shue Tai 樟樹頭
- Area
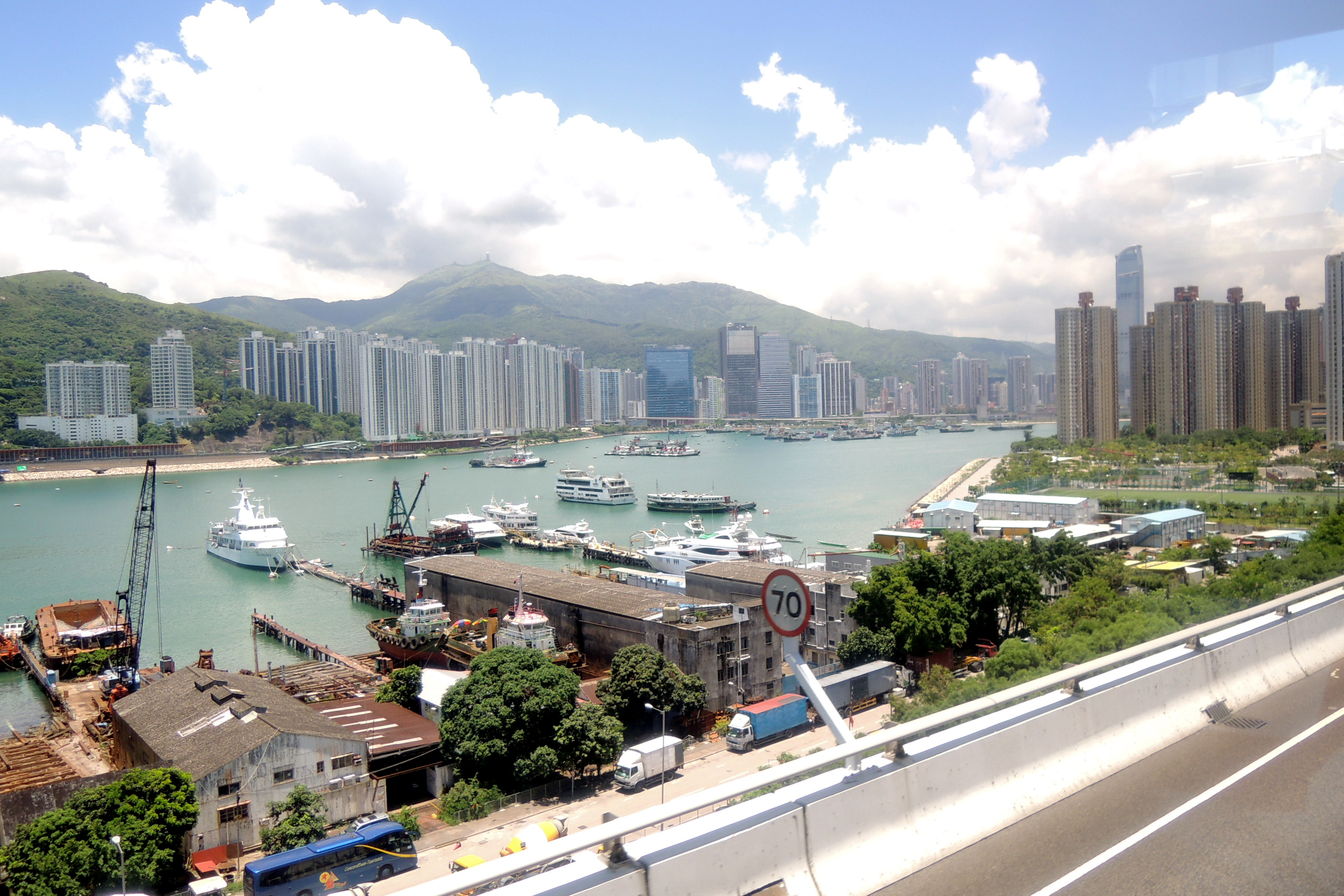
- Cheung Shue Tau, viewing from Tsing Yi North Coastal Road
- Interactive map of Cheung Shue Tai
- Country: China
- Region: Hong Kong
- Area: New Territories
- Island: Tsing Yi

Cheung Shue Tau (Chinese: 樟樹頭) is an industrial and recreation area on the north shore of Tsing Yi Island, facing Rambler Channel in Hong Kong. Originally an isolated village situated along beaches and a valley, between Yau Kom Tau and Tam Kon Shan, it became home to numerous shipyards that were relocated from Cheung Sha Wan in the last 1960s, with ferry services providing access to Tsuen Wan. Following the development of Cheung On Estate, Tam Kon Shan Road made the area accessible by road vehicles and public transport, namely green minibuses. The area was later redeveloped to the east into Tsing Yi Northeast Park, one of a major park in Kwai Tsing District, serving as a buffer area between industrial west and residential east. The Tsing Yi North Coastal Road expressway, part of the transport link to the new Hong Kong International Airport, was subsequently constructed on the hill above it, with a viaduct linking it to Tam Kon Shan Road.

== Etymology ==
Cheung Shue Tau is a common village name in southern China. The name derives from Cheung Shue, camphor tree, which is valued for its camphor and timber. According to tradition, the village was characterised by a large camphor tree. Similarly, the neighbouring village of Yau Kom Tau was associated with Yau Kom, namely Phyllanthus emblica.

== History ==
Cheung Shue Tau was an isolated village facing north towards the Rambler Channel, extending along beaches and rocky shores, as well as a valley with a stream. From an aerial photograph taken by an aircraft based on the carrier HMS Pegasus in 1924, the site of Cheung Shue Tau was shown to have been cultivated as rice paddies, and so do a map of 1945. In 1962, detailed map shows a lime kiln, a brickworks, a pier, a large burial ground, some quarries and numerous "temporary" houses in the area, alongside rice paddies. The production of lime was a traditional industry on the island. The area was rich in high-quality kaolin, which once supported a flourishing ceramics industry. The red soil on the north hills of the island was suitable for making red bricks.

In the early 1960s, the reclamation of Cheung Sha Wan forced small shipyards to relocate to the north shore of Tsing Yi Island, particularly to Tam Kon Shan and Cheung Shue Tau. In 1963, it was reported that more than twenty shipyards were involved, and proposals were made for extensive development on the island, including the construction of a bridge linking it to Texaco Road in Tsuen Wan and a road to the shipyards. Some development did take place during the 1960s, including the commencement of reclamation at Tsing Yi Bay, the construction of the new Mun Tsai Tong Typhoon Shelter, and the establishment of several resettlement villages. The definition of Victoria Harbour was also extended to include the waters north of Tsing Yi Island. However, the first bridge, Tsing Yi Bridge, was not built until the 1970s, connecting to the island’s southern and western industrial areas, while direct road access to the shipyards was not realised until decades later.

By 1963, Cheung Shue Tau was undergoing reclamation in preparation for the shipyards. By this time, the lime kiln had been removed, and the brickworks were soon to be demolished. The old pier was removed during the reclamation, and a new, longer pier was constructed and relocated westward. A row of houses was built, and many of the temporary structures were demolished. In 1964, the Hong Kong Government issued a tender notice for twenty lots along the shore, each measuring 42 by 422 feet, including a slipway, with payment to be made in instalments over 20 years. In 1969, an aerial photograph showed the shipyards densely packed along the coast, extending from the island’s northernmost point in the east to the western side of the estuary at Cheung Shue Tau. By 1972, another aerial photograph showed that many slipways had been completed.

In the early years of the shipyards, there was no mains electricity, and power was supplied by generators. Before the construction of Tam Kon Shan Road, workers travelled by walla-walla, a small boat taxi. At that time, the area also contained a number of squatter dwellings, as well as small restaurants and stalls. During heavy rain, work would halt, and workers often gathered in the stalls to play mahjong.

By 1983, a new wave of development on the island had commenced. The land from Mun Tsai Tong to the edge of the shipyards was levelled to make way for new housing developments, and plans were made to reclaim Mun Tsai Tong. By 1987, the high-rise housing estates of Cheung On Estate, Cheung Fat Estate and Ching Tai Court had been built on the site, together with Queen’s College Old Boys’ Association Secondary School opposite the shipyards. At the same time, Tam Kon Shan Road was constructed, extending through Cheung On Estate to the eastern end of Cheung Shue Tau. Cheung Shue Tau became integrated into the urban area of the island.

In 1992, the Airport Core Programme reached Cheung Shue Tau. The slopes facing the shipyards were reconstructed, making way for the extension of Tam Kon Shan Road. By 1996, 90% of the detailed design for the Tsing Yi North Coastal Road had been completed, and preparation of the tender documents was under way. The tender notice was issued on 9 October 1998. The construction began in 1999 and the road was opened in 2002.

The villagers of Cheung Shue Tau were relocated to public housing in Cheung On Estate and Cheung Fat Estate during the development.

The residents of the housing estates, together with the teachers and students of the school, could not tolerate the loud noise from the shipyards. This led to a plan in 1996 to relocate some shipyards approximately 200 metres away to Yau Kom Tau. Regardless the protest from owners and workers in 1997, the removal of certain yards commencing on 2 November 1999. All shipyards in the affected area were cleared by June 2000. Reclamation of the site began in 2001, transforming the area into Tsing Yi Northeast Park, which opened on 28 May 2010. Tam Kon Shan Road was extended to Yau Kam Tau as a result of the shipyards relocation. The Hong Kong Shipyard, a large facility for ferry repairing and maintenance, marked the new end of the row of shipyards, with the Hong Kong Cement Tsing Yi Plant as its neighbour.

== Industry ==
The primary industry in the area is shipbuilding and maintenance. The Environmental Protection Department operates an Portable Emission Measurement System Laboratory in the area.

== Education ==
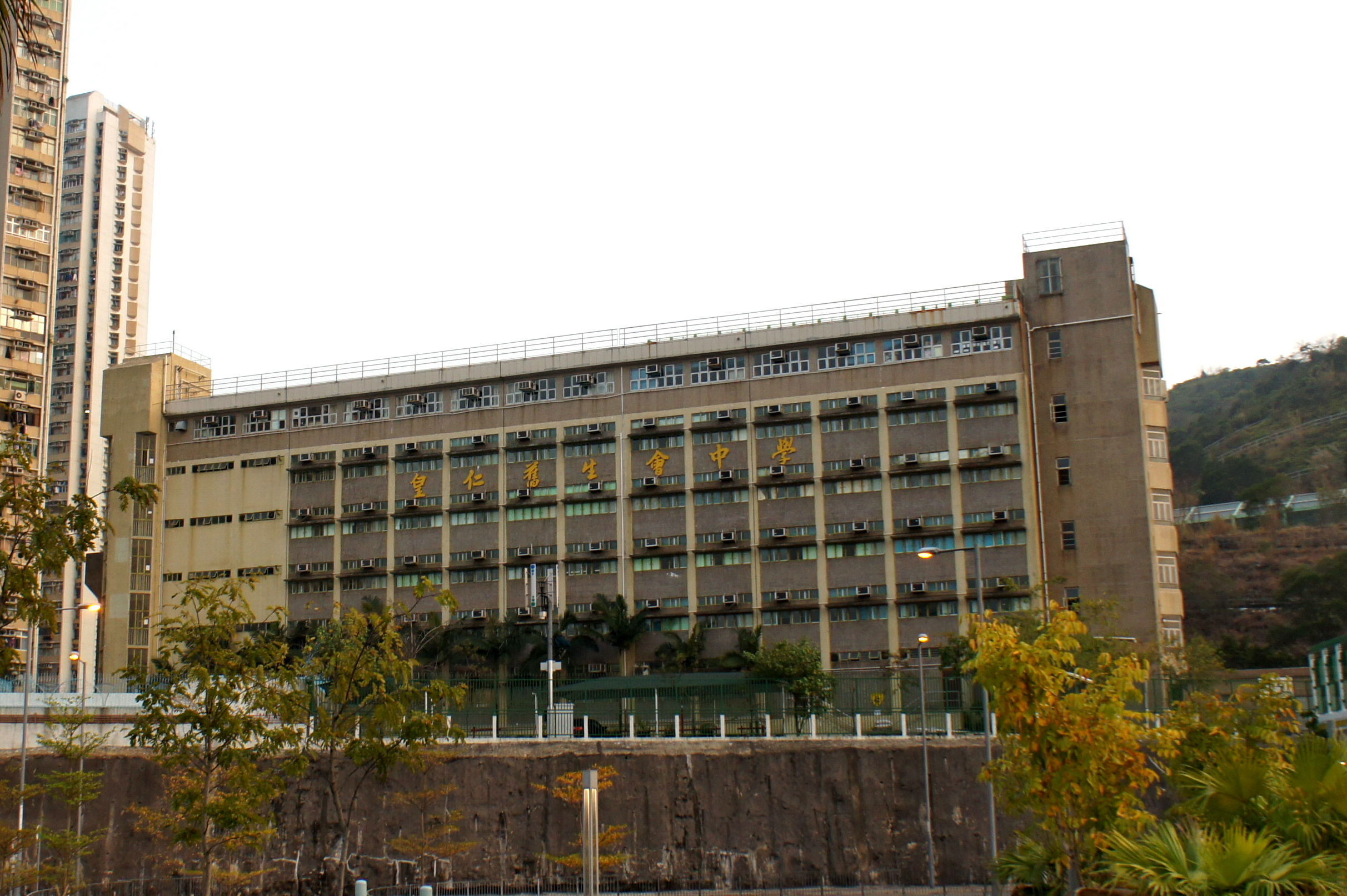
Queen's College Old Boys' Association Secondary School

Queen’s College Old Boys’ Association Secondary School is a secondary school on Tam Kon Shan Road.

== Recreation ==
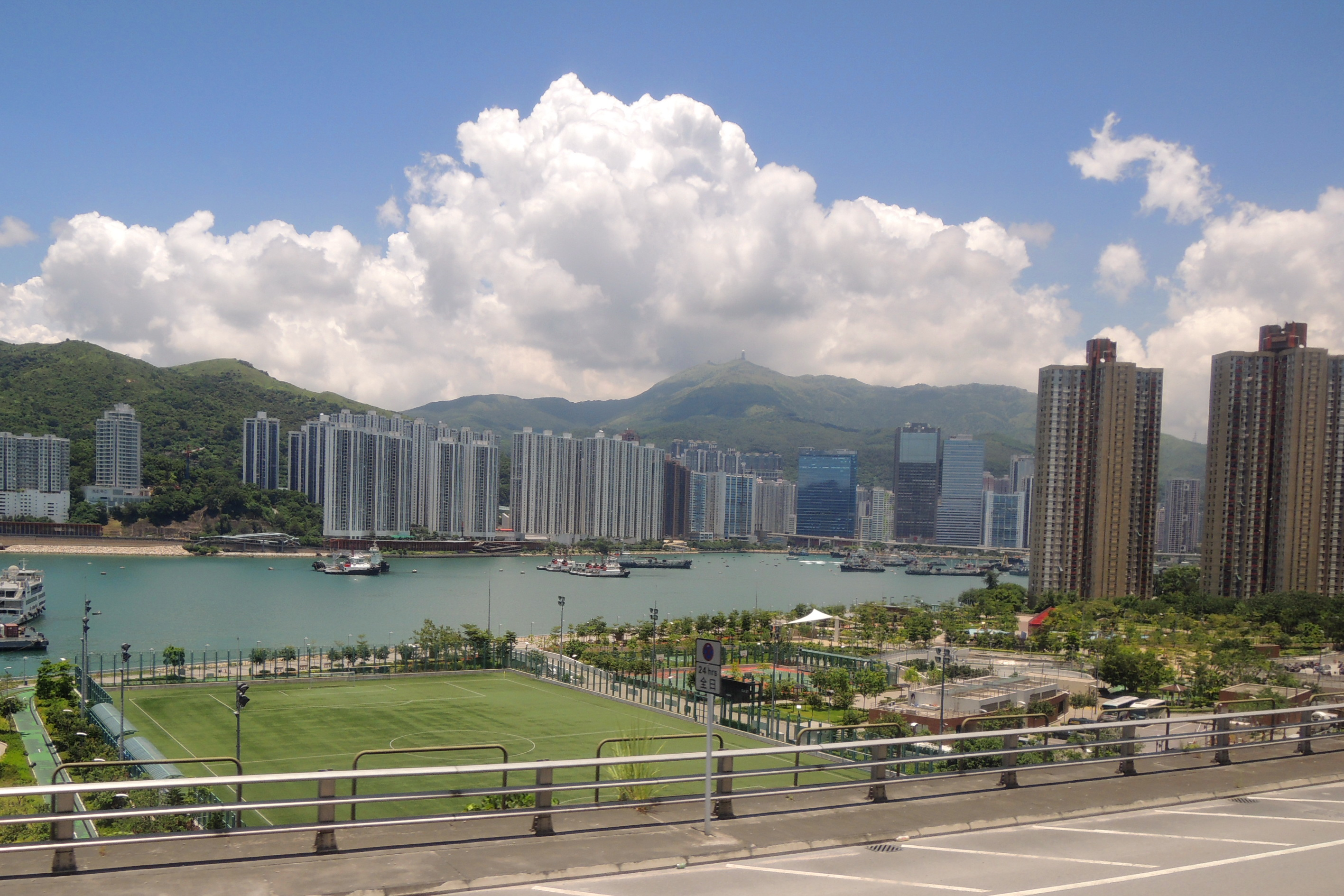
Tsing Yi Northeast Park

Tsing Yi Northeast Park, opened in phases beginning on 28 May 2010, is a 5.8-hectare waterfront park located at No. 10 Tam Kon Shan Road, connected to the Tsing Yi Waterfront Promenade. It is situated on the former site of the shipyards and reclaimed land.

Fong Tin Mei Path is a hiking path from the lower ground of Cheung Shue Tan to the upper ground of Cheung Wang Estate.

== Festival ==
Tsing Yi Tam Kon Shan Yu Lan Festival, part of Yu Lan Festival in Hong Kong and recognised as an intangible cultural heritage of the city, were held on the 15th to the 17th days of the seventh lunar month along the shipyards area on Tam Kon Shan Road.

== Transportation ==
The main road in the area is Tam Kon Shan Road, also known as a shipyard street, which connects Cheung On Estate, Cheung Shue Tau and Yau Kom Tau. The Tsing Yi North Coastal Road is an elevated expressway, with viaducts linking it to Tam Kon Shan Road at both Cheung Shue Tau and Yau Kom Tau.

Green Minibus Route 88A is the only form of public transport serving the area.
