= Tsing Yi Northeast Park =

Public park in Tsing Yi, Hong Kong

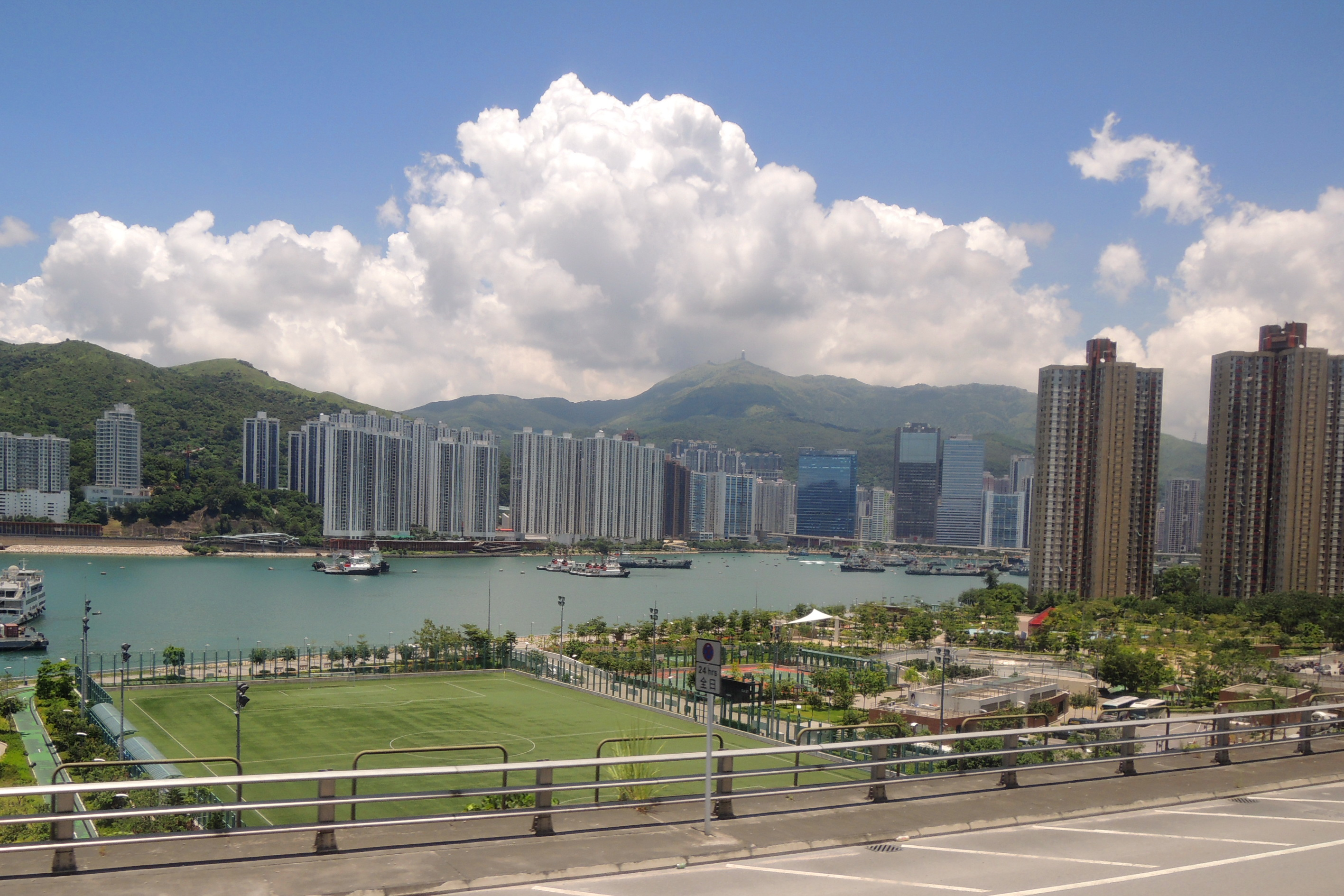
- Tsing Yi Northeast Park, viewing from Tsing Yi North Coastal Road
- Interactive map of Tsing Yi Northeast Park
- Type: Public Park
- Location: 10 Tam Kon Shan Road, Tsing Yi, New Territories, Hong Kong
- Area: 5.8 hectares (14 acres)
- Operator: Leisure and Cultural Service Department
- Open: May 28, 2010; 16 years ago

Chinese name
- Traditional Chinese: 青衣東北公園
Transcriptions

Tsing Yi Northeast Park is a major public park in Kwai Tsing District in Hong Kong. It is located at 10 Tam Kon Shan Road and occupies 5.8 hectares on the north shore of Tsing Yi Island. The park is bordered by the water of Rambler Channel, a housing estate of Ching Tai Court, Tam Kon Shan Road and a buffered zone adjacent to a long stretch of shipyards continuing the shoreline. Across the road stands Queen’s College Old Boys’ Association Secondary School, within a housing estate of Cheung On Estate. Other major parks on the island includes Tsing Yi Park and Tsing Yi Promenade.

The park forms the western terminus of a continuous waterfront promenade system, which also includes the promenade outside Ching Tai Court and Cheung Fat Estate, Tsing Yi Promenade, Tsing Yi Fireboat Fire Station and Cheung Fai Road Promenade, together covering much of the island’s northeastern shoreline.

The park serves as a recreational space catering to the diverse needs of people of all ages. Along the coast lies a waterfront promenade, while around a quarter of the park, at the west end, is taken up by a football pitch with a spectator stand. The remaining area is centred on a piazza with water features, complemented by landscaped gardens. Other facilities include two basketball courts that can be converted into volleyball courts, a gateball court, two cycling tracks, one designed for children, two children’s play areas, paved walking paths, a jogging trail with fitness stations, and a fitness corner for the elderly. Additional amenities comprise a bicycle kiosk, car parks, and accessible toilets. The park is open 24 hours a day, although some facilities are only available during designated hours.

Situated between Tam Kon Shan and Cheung Shue Tau, the park emerged from long-standing tensions between the established shipyard zone and the later construction of high-rise residential estates, particularly over noise concerns. Some shipyards were demolished and eventually relocated westwards to Yau Kom Tau, also on the north shore. Tsing Yi Northeast Park was subsequently developed on the vacated shipyard land and reclaimed sections of the northern coastline.

Only public transport is New Territories green minibus route 88A along Tam Kon Shan Road, but visitors can walk from Cheung On Bus Terminus, a major bus interchange in Tsing Yi.

== Aims ==
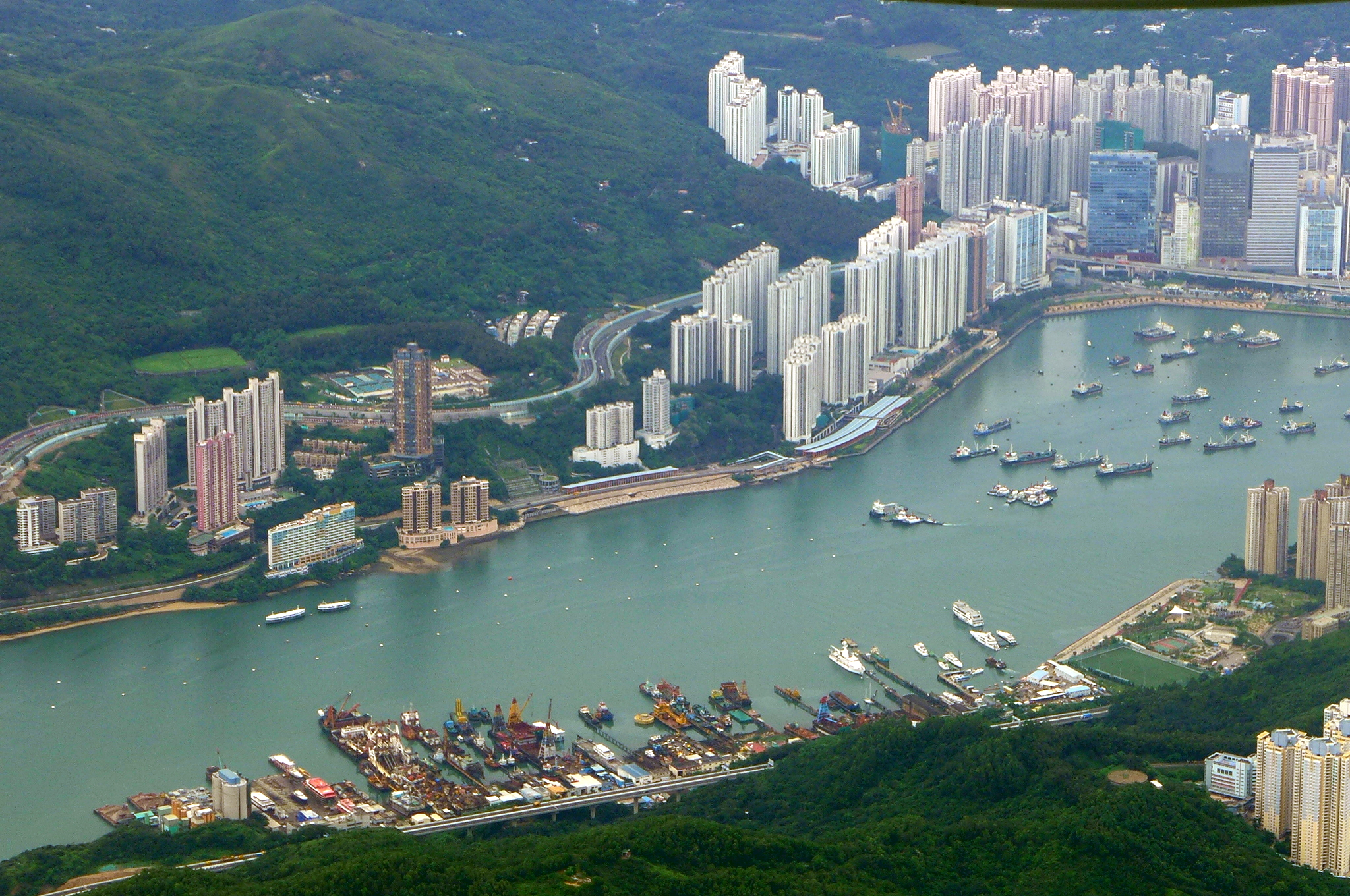
Rambler Channel (middle), Tsuen Wan (top) and Tsing Yi (bottom). On Tsing Yi side,Tsing Yi Northeast Park (right) and (middle and left)

According to a document from Legislative Council in April 2001, the aim of the construction was to address the noise nuisance affecting the residence of Ching Tai Court and Cheung On Estate, as well as Queen’s College Old Boys’ Association Secondary School, while also providing open space in northern Tsing Yi. The project involved the reclamation of foreshore and seabed, covering approximately 3.8 hectares; site formation of around 3.2 hectares; construction of a seawall approximately 520 metres long; drainage works; and decontamination of the site. At that time, Tsing Yi required 12 hectares of land to address the shortage of open space. The reclaimed land serves as a buffer, separating the industrial zone to the west from the residential zone to the east. The site also helped alleviate the shortage of public filling areas, with a capacity of 500,000 cubic metres, supporting the disposal of inert construction and demolition materials at landfills.

== History ==
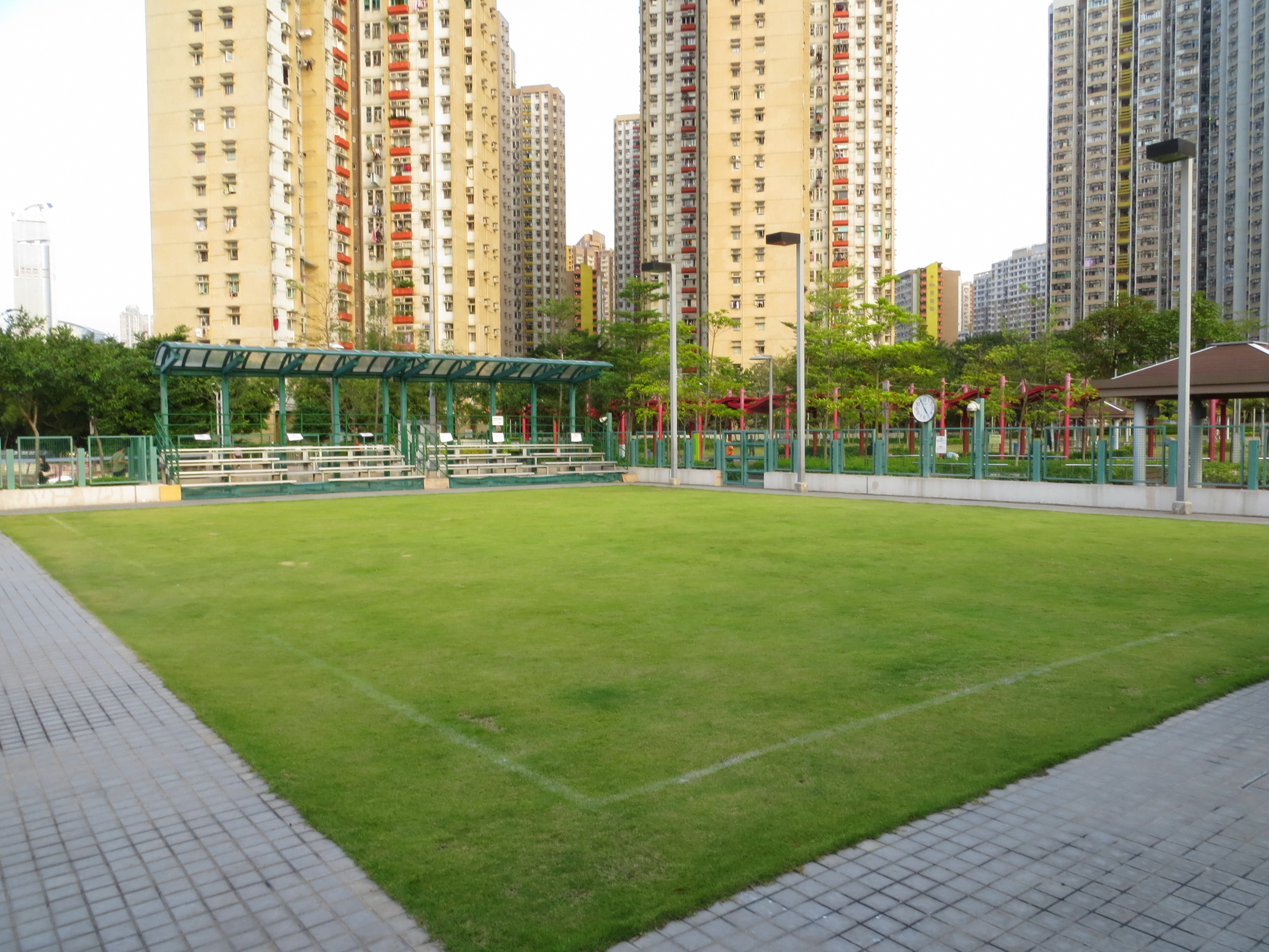
Three blocks of flats adjacent to the park, as seen from the gateball court

Before any development, the site of the park was originally a small estuary, with stones and boulders deposited by a nearby stream, according to a map of 1928. The majority of the park was on the reclamation off the shore.

In the 1960s, the reclamation of Cheung Sha Wan for urban development, in the western section of Kowloon, forced numerous shipyards to relocate to the isolated north shore of Tsing Yi Island, stretching from the hamlet of Cheung Shue Tau to the western shore of the then-peninsula of Tam Kon Shan. By 1963, the shore had been prepared, and in 1964 the shipyards moved in, continuing to construct factories and slipways over the following years. At that time, there was no mains power supply, and the only means of transport were taking walla-walla to Tsuen Wan at the pier at Cheung Shue Tau or walking over the hills across Tam Kon Shan to the former Tsing Yi Ferry Pier in what was then Tsing Yi Hui. Life in the area remained largely undisturbed until further development of the island reached this shore.

In 1983, a new wave of housing development commenced in the northeast section of the island. The hill of Tam Kon Shan and part of Nga Ying Chau were levelled, and the Mun Tsai Tong typhoon shelter was reclaimed. New clusters of high-rise buildings were constructed, forming the housing estates of Cheung On Estate, Cheung Fat Estate, and Ching Tai Court. A new road, Tam Kon Shan Road, was constructed, providing road access to the shipyard area. By 1988, when the new developments became populated, three blocks of flats in Ching Tai Court and Cheung On Estate, along with the secondary school, directly faced the shipyards. The heavy noise from the shipyards had become intolerable.

Tensions between the shipyards and the new residents came to a head in 1996, when the Hong Kong Government decided to relocate some shipyards westwards to Yau Kom Tau, along the same north shore. The owners and workers protested in 1997, claiming that the relocation would harm their livelihoods. Despite the protests, the government proceeded to terminate their tenancies, and demolition commenced on 2 November 1999. The affected area was fully cleared by June 2000.

Before reclamation proceeded, there were concerns about soil contamination from the former shipyard operations, particularly regarding dioxins, similar to the issues encountered at Penny Bay during the Hong Kong Disneyland project. The site was decontaminated, and reclamation began in 2001, transforming the area into Tsing Yi Northeast Park, which opened on 28 May 2010.

== Features ==
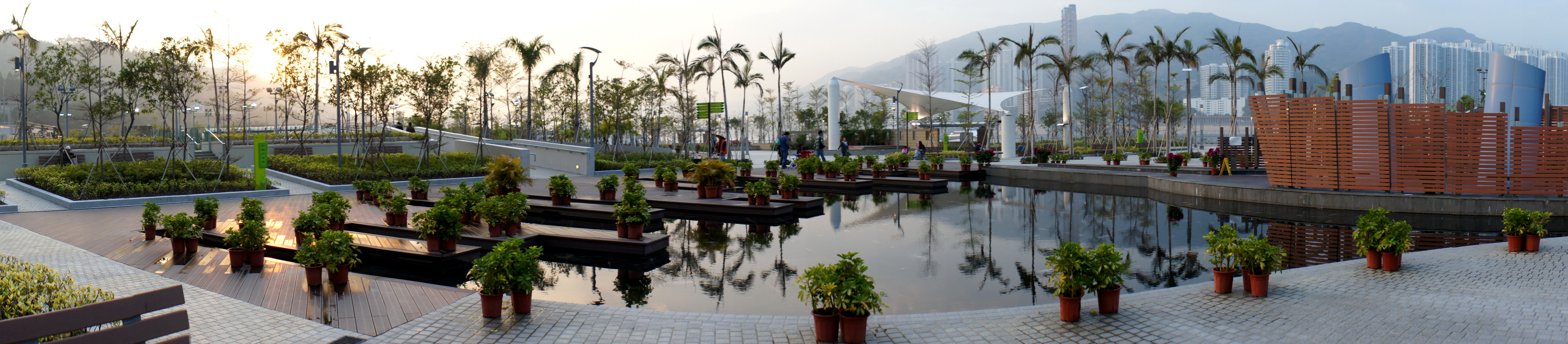
Piazza with water feature
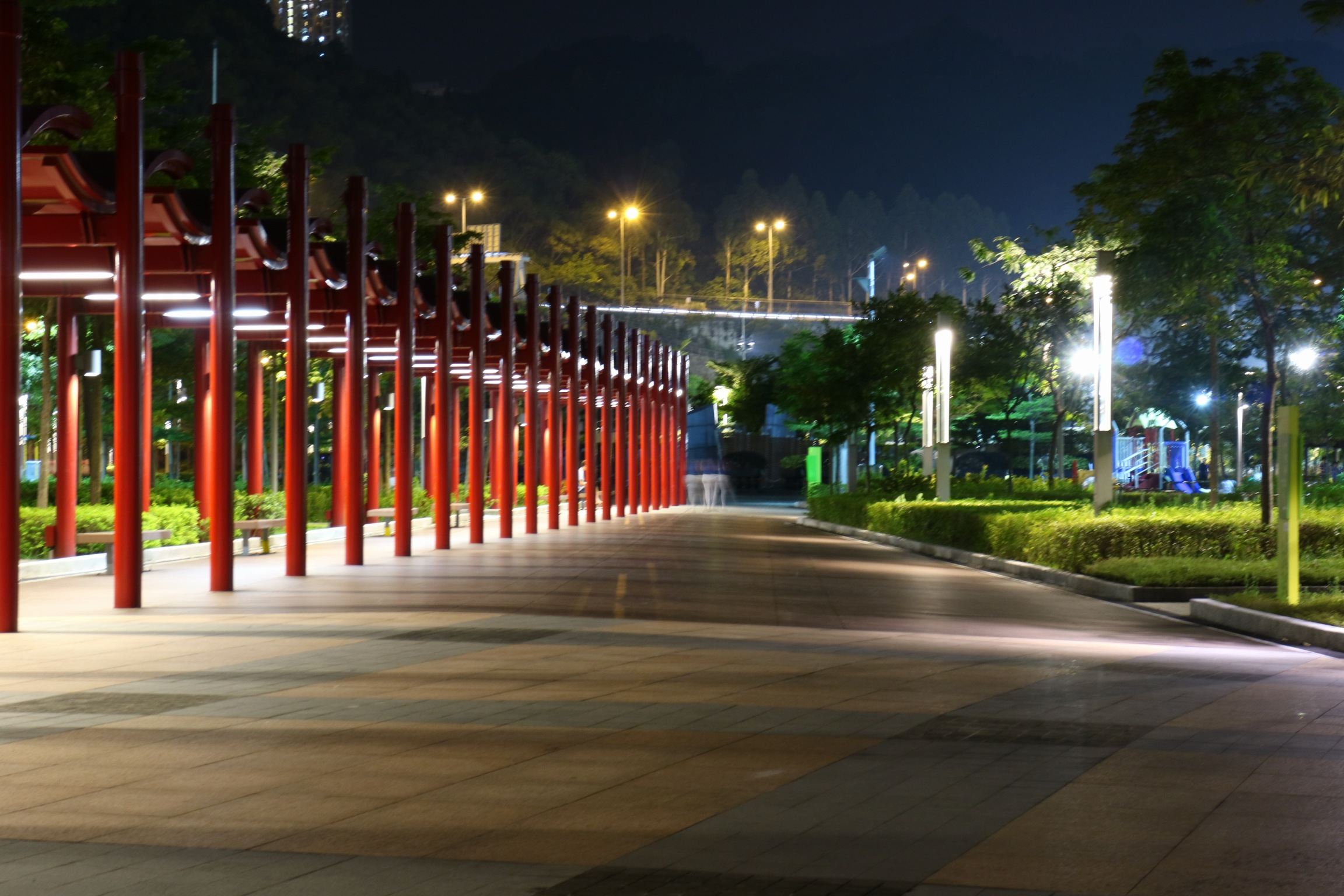
Covered walkway supported by two rows of red columns

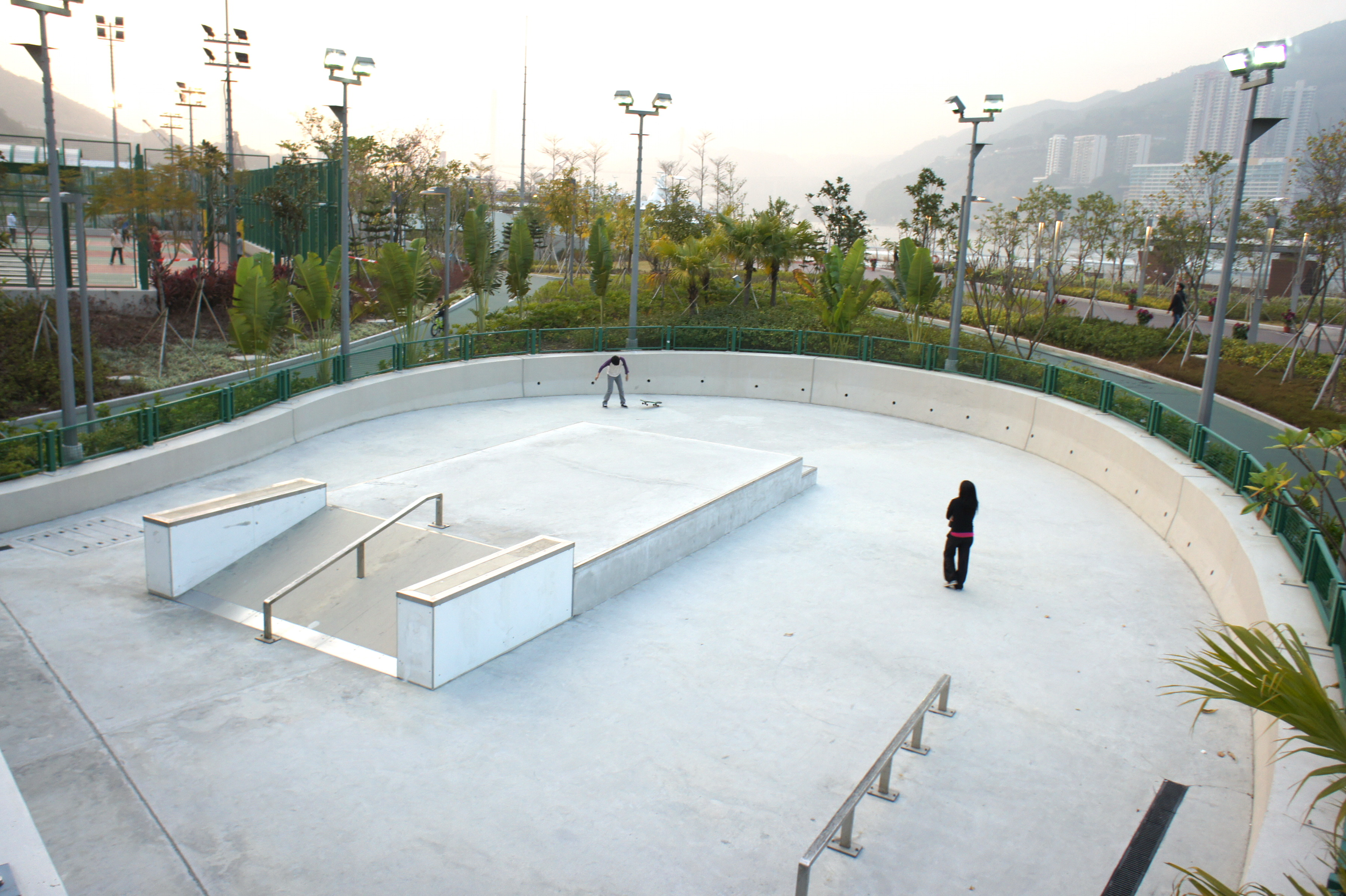
Skate park

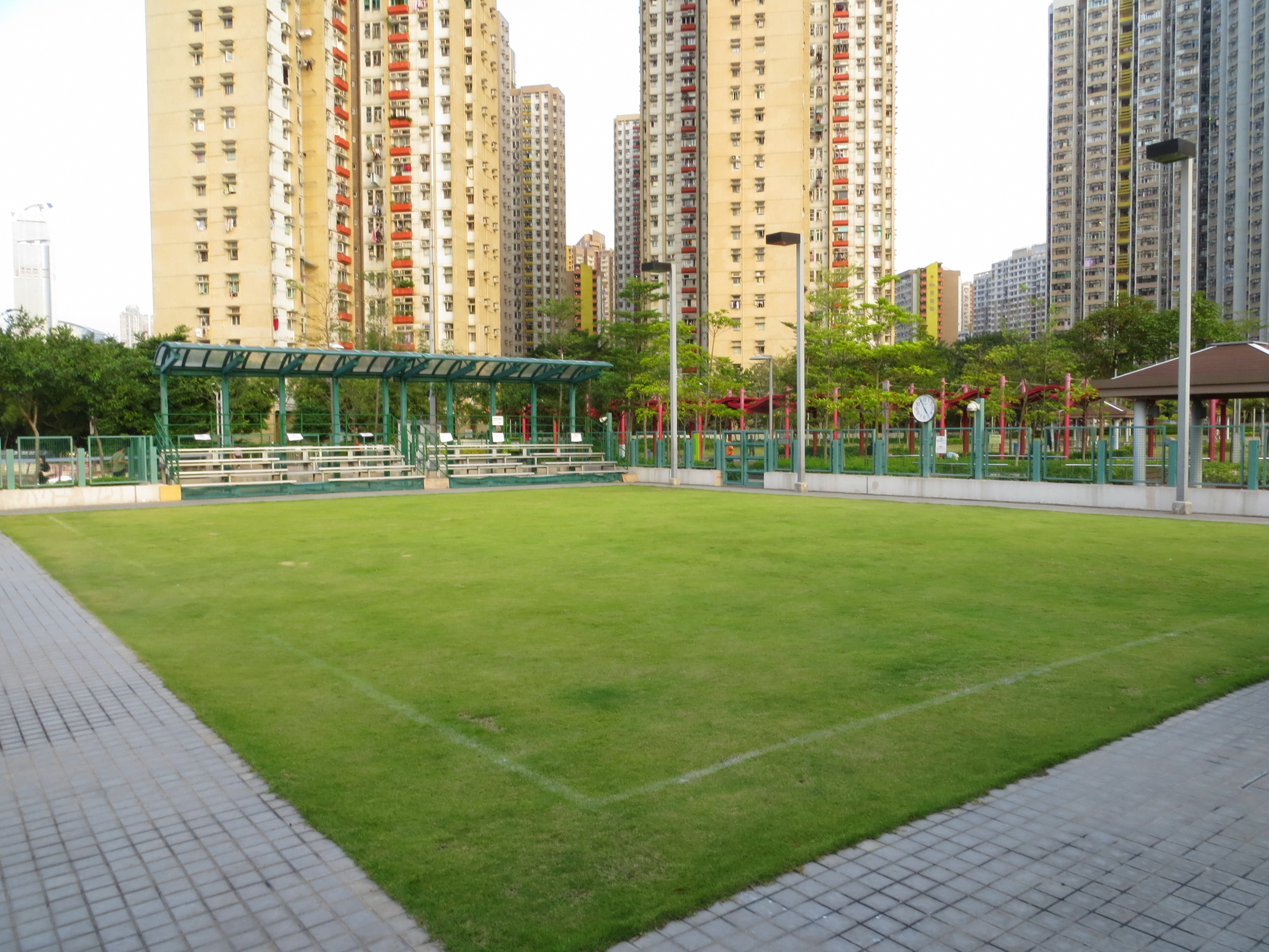
Gateball court

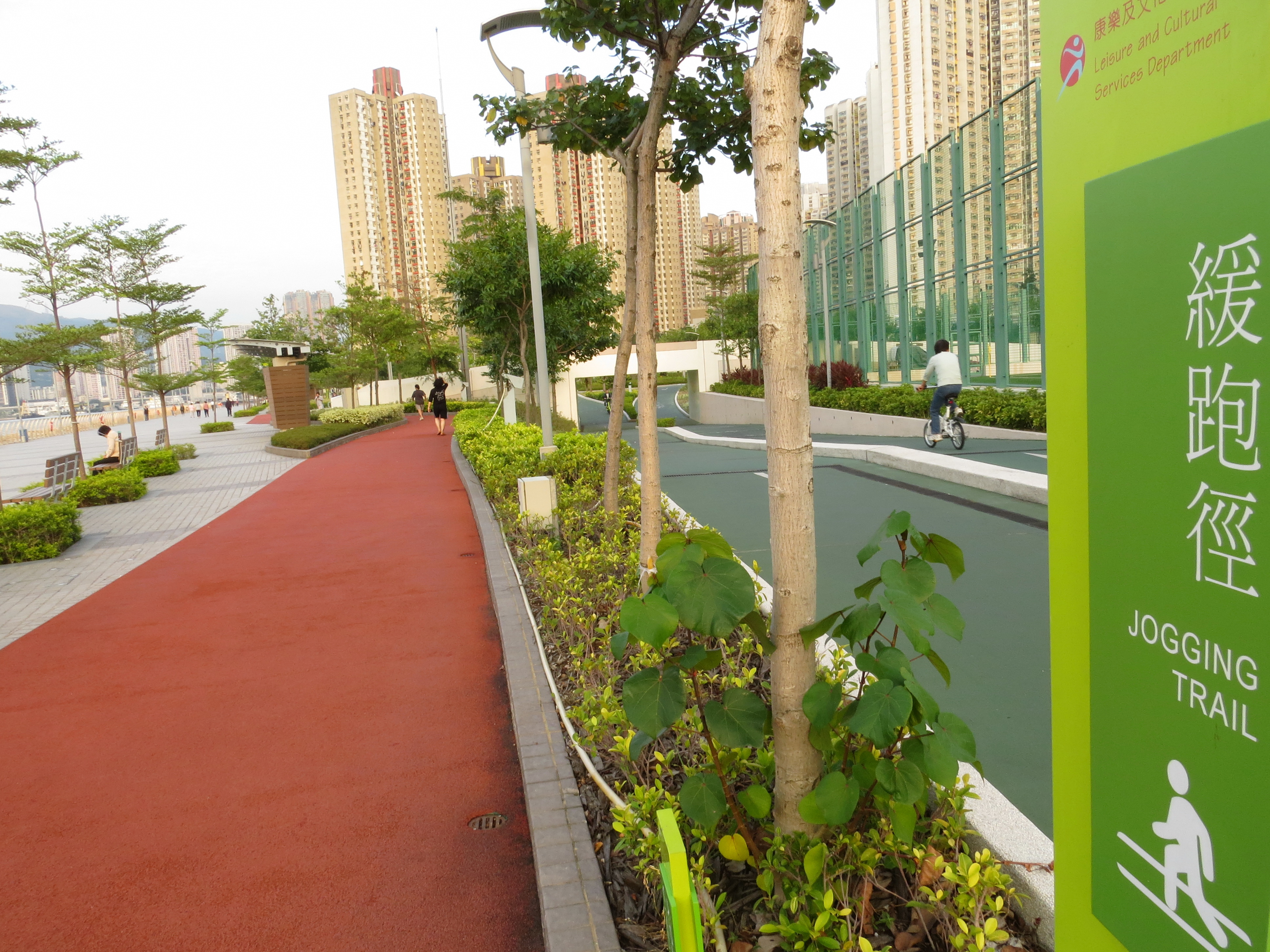
Jogging trail

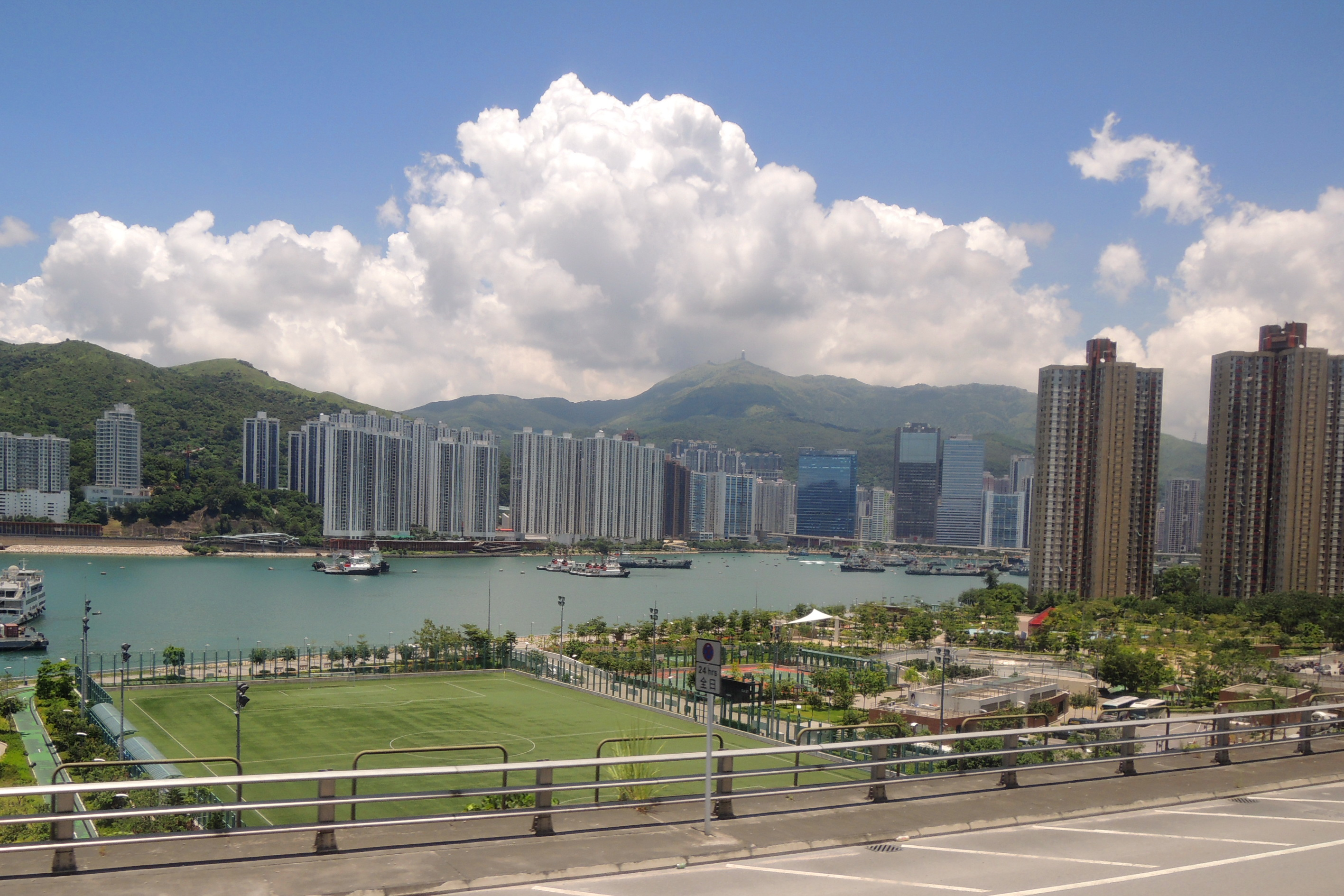
Football pitch

== Transportation ==
The New Territories green minibus route 88A, designated as heading towards Tam Kon Shan, provides access to the park. It operates from either Mayfair Gardens or Tsing Yi Station via Cheung On Bus Terminus. The minibus stops at most locations along Tam Kon Shan Road on request, including the park itself.

Cheung On Bus Terminus, a major bus interchange in Tsing Yi located in front of Cheung Fat Shopping Centre, provides numerous of public bus routes from many major locations across Hong Kong. Visitors could reach to the park within a few minutes' walk.
