= Tam Kon Shan =

Coordinates: 22.3570°N 114.0922°E

Tam Kon Shan 擔杆山 or 担扞山
- Urban
- Interactive map of Tam Kon Shan

Tam Kon Shan (Chinese: 擔杆山 or 担杆山) is a levelled hill on a hammerhead-like peninsula situated between Moon Tsai Tong and Cheung Shue Tau on Tsing Yi Island in Hong Kong. The peninsula was flat but slightly curved upward in the middle, resembling a bamboo carrying pole, which gave the hill its name, Tam Kon.

In the 1980s, the surrounding areas of the peninsula were reclaimed. In 1983, the hill itself was leveled to make way for the development of housing estates Cheung On Estate, Cheung Fat Estate and Ching Tai Court, and its names sometimes applied to a higher southwestern hill across the former land bridge.

As the original hill disappeared, the exact location associated with the name became uncertain. Several features in the development are named after Tam Kon Shan, including Tam Kon Shan Road, Tam Kon Shan Interchange, and Tam Kon Shan Tunnel. Tam Kon Shan Road runs westward along the shipyard areas of Cheung Shue Tau and Yau Kom Tau, and the surrounding shipyard neighbourhoods are sometimes referred to as Tam Kon Shan, taking their name from the road. Tam Kon Shan Interchange and Tam Kon Shan Tunnel, a rail tunnel for Tung Chung line and Airport Express, are named after the southwestern hill.
