= Agriculture and aquaculture in Hong Kong =

Overview of fishing in Hong Kong

Agriculture and aquaculture in Hong Kong are considered sunset industries. Most agricultural produce is directly imported from the neighbouring mainland China. In 2006 the industry accounts for less than 0.3% of the labour sector. Geographically Hong Kong consists largely of steep, unproductive hillside. The local aquaculture industry is also facing challenges from competition with imported aquatic food products and concern of fish and seafood safety.

== History ==
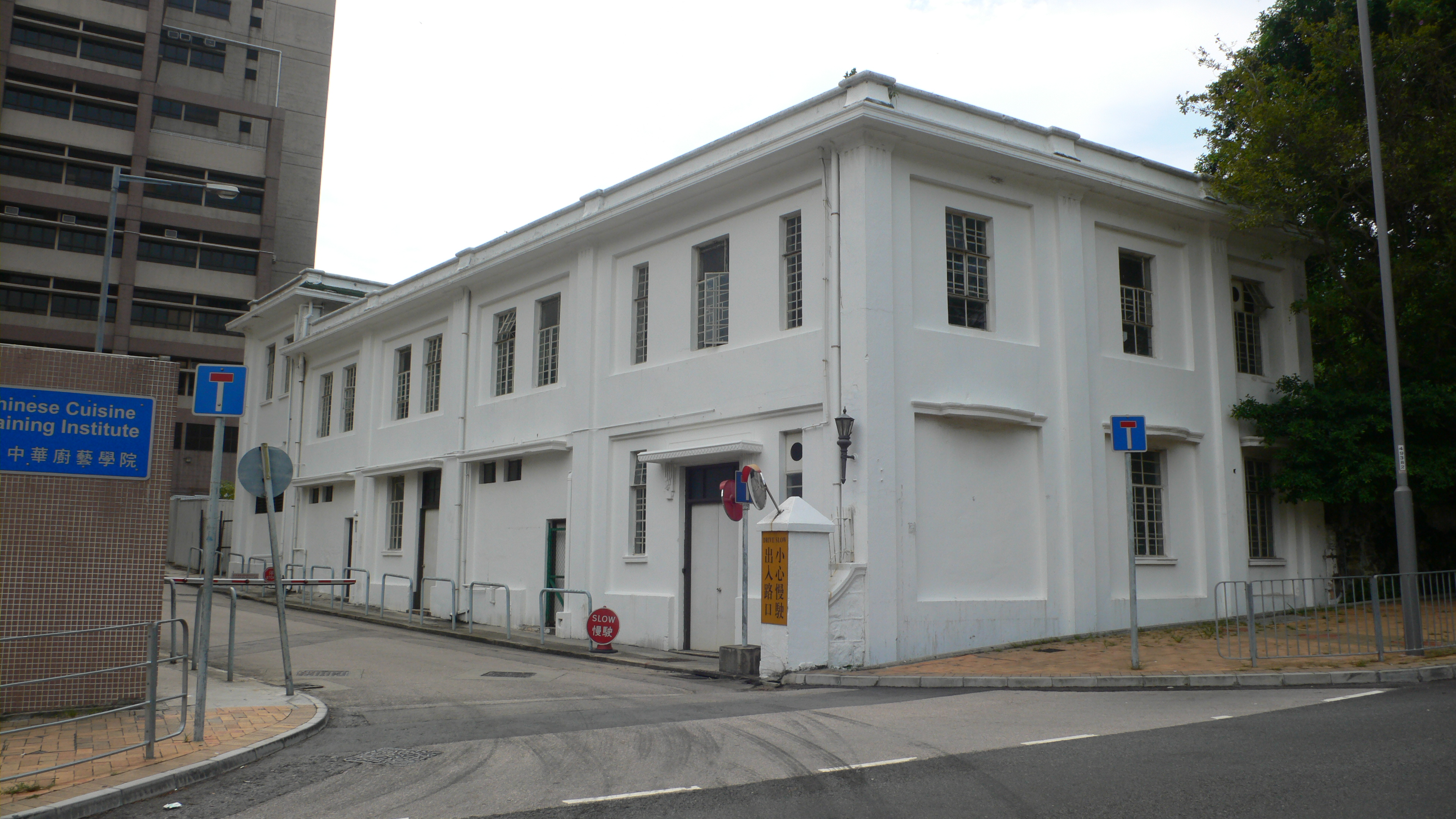
Old office of Hong Kong Dairy Farm

In the colonial Hong Kong era around the 1850s, agriculture in Hong Kong consisted mostly of revenue farms that focused on opium productions. The industry led to many wealthy Chinese businessmen, who established themselves as the middlemen merchants with international connection. Some of the successful farmers included Yan Wo Hong and Wo Hang Hong from 1858 to 1887. The system was discontinued by colonial authorities, when the economy needed to diversify in other activities. The last opium farm ended in 1913. One of the farms founded in the era was Hong Kong Dairy Farm in 1886. As Hong Kong government favour the transition into a secondary sector, and eventually a tertiary sector, agriculture became a reduced segment.

Organic farming was introduced in 1988. An Accredited Farm Scheme for protecting the environment and consumers against residues of agricultural pesticides was introduced in 1994. Accredited farms strictly monitor and supervise the uses of pesticides, and produce are further analysed for chemical remnants before they are sold at accredited retail outlets. In 1994 the agriculture and fisheries industry represented 2.7% of the work force and just a mere 0.2% of the total GDP.

== Consumption ==
Statistically, Hong Kong can only produce enough for 20% of the local population without depending on mainland imports. In the mid-1990s, 50% of Hong Kong's water resources were still purchased from the mainland. Hong Kong has always depended heavily on imports. The dependency on imports has increased steadily, since the ratio of population growth far exceed agricultural production numbers. In 2007, Hong Kong's population of almost 7 million daily consumed the following.

Type	Measurements
Fruits	1,540 Tonnes
Poultry	110 Tonnes
Freshwater fish	80 Tonnes
Cattle	130 heads
Vegetables	1,510 Tonnes
Eggs	220 Tonnes
Marine Fish	340 Tonnes
Pigs	5,620 heads

In 2012, Hong Kong's population of more than 7.1 million daily consumed:

Type	Measurements
Poultry	36 Tonnes
Cattle	71 heads
Vegetables	2,290 Tonnes
Rice	833 Tonnes
Pigs	4,480 heads

== Agriculture ==
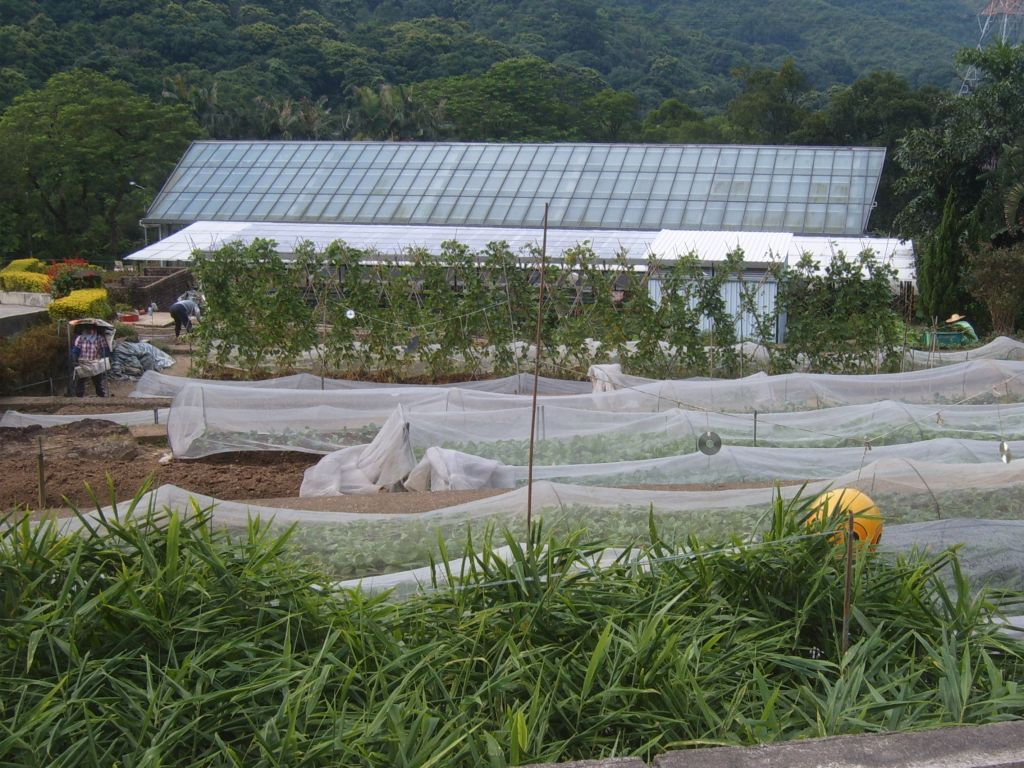
Kadoorie Farm and Botanic Garden.

In 2006, there were 2,100 farms in the territory, employing directly about 5,300 farmers and workers. By the end of 2005, the land used for vegetable, flower, field crop, and orchard are 330 ha, 190 ha, 30 ha, and 290 ha respectively. A fact sheet published in 2014 estimates that only 7 square kilometres of land in Hong Kong are actively farmed.

Agriculture industry produced HK$1,180 million worth of produce in 2005. It comprises HK$264 million of crop production, HK$554 million of livestock production and KH$360 million of poultry production. The average daily production of vegetable, live chicken and live pigs are 67 tonnes, 32,000 birds and 1,030 heads respectively. In 2005, local production accounted for 4% of fresh vegetables, 52% of live poultry and 18% of live pigs consumed in the territory. In 2012, the gross value of local agricultural production totalled $766 million. 1.9 per cent of the vegetables Hong Kong people consumed, together with 60 per cent of the live poultry and 7 per cent of the live pigs, come from local farms.

=== Principal crops ===
The value of crop production amounted to $272 million in 2003. Vegetable and flower production account for about 97% of the total value, being $264 million in 2003. Vegetable crops grown all year round include white cabbage, flowering cabbage, lettuce, Chinese kale, radish, leaf mustard, spring onion and chive. Spinach, watercress, and matrimony vine are produced in the cooler months. Yardlong beans, water spinach, amaranth, cucumber, and several species of Chinese gourd are produced in summer. A wide range of temperate vegetables including tomato, sweet pepper, cauliflower, carrot, and celery are grown in winter.

Flower cultivation has gained importance in recent years. Gladiolus, lily, and chrysanthemum are grown in winter; and ginger lily and lotus flower in summer. Peach blossom is grown especially for the Lunar New Year. A wide range of fruit is grown on the lower hill slopes, the main types being lychee, longan, wampee, local lemon, orange, tangerine, guava, papaya and banana.

== Animal husbandry ==
There were 281 local pig farms and 205 local poultry farms in 2004. During 2003, local pig production was valued at $527 million and local poultry production, including pigeons and eggs was valued at $250 million. Pigs raised on local farms are crosses derived from Duroc, Landrace and Large White parent stock. The majority of local chickens raised on farms are Shek Ki cross bred chickens. Recently, brand name chickens like Ka Mei chickens and Tai on chickens have been introduced to local market by local investors. There are two dairies in active operation with a total herd population of less than 50 cows.

== Aquaculture and fishing ==
Accredited Fish Farm Scheme Logo

The commercially important marine species are bigeye, golden thread, croaker, horse-head and pomfret. The total capture fisheries and marine fish culture production is equivalent to about 31% of seafood consumed in Hong Kong, while pond fish farmers produce about 6% of the freshwater fish eaten. The majority of fish farms in New Territories are engaged in carp polyculture (bighead carp, silver carp, common carp and grass carp) in combination with tilapia or grey mullet as the major species. Other cultured species include seabreams and spotted scat. At present there are 26 fish culture zones designated under the "Marine Fish Culture Ordinance". Common species cultured include green grouper, brownspotted grouper, Russell's snapper, mangrove snapper, cobia and pompano. The voluntary "Accredited Fish Farm Scheme" has been launched to assist local fish farmers.

=== Fishing ===
Hong Kong's fishing activities are conducted mainly in the waters of the adjacent continental shelf in the South and East China Seas. They extend over a 160 kilometre wide section of this shelf between the Gulf of Tonkin and the East China Sea. The majority of the fishing vessels are crewed by family members with the assistance of hired hands. Main fishing methods include trawling, long-lining, gill-netting and purse-seining with the majority of the total catch obtained through trawling. The industry now consists of some 4,150 fishing vessels and some 9,200 fishermen working abroad and provides employment in ancillary sectors servicing the fishing industry, such as fish wholesale and retail marketing, fuel and fishing gear supply and ice manufacturing

=== Aquaculture ===
Aquaculture includes marine fish culture, pond fish culture and oyster culture. In 2005 production from the aquaculture sector was 3,725 tonnes valued at HK$120 million which was 2.2 per cent in weight and 6.7 per cent in value of the total fisheries production. Data collected in 2012 shows the total amount of land occupied for Fish ponds total 1,130 hectares and are mainly located in north-western New Territories. About 990 licensees units are engaged in marine fish culture. Common species cultured include green grouper, brown-spotted grouper, Russell's snapper, mangrove snapper, cobia and pompano. Total marine fish culture production in 2012 amounted to 1 299 tonnes, valued at $117 million.

The production from the aquaculture sector has evolved over time: 563 tonnes in 1977, 3,000 tonnes in 1989, 3,284 tonnes in 2019.

==== Marine fish culture ====
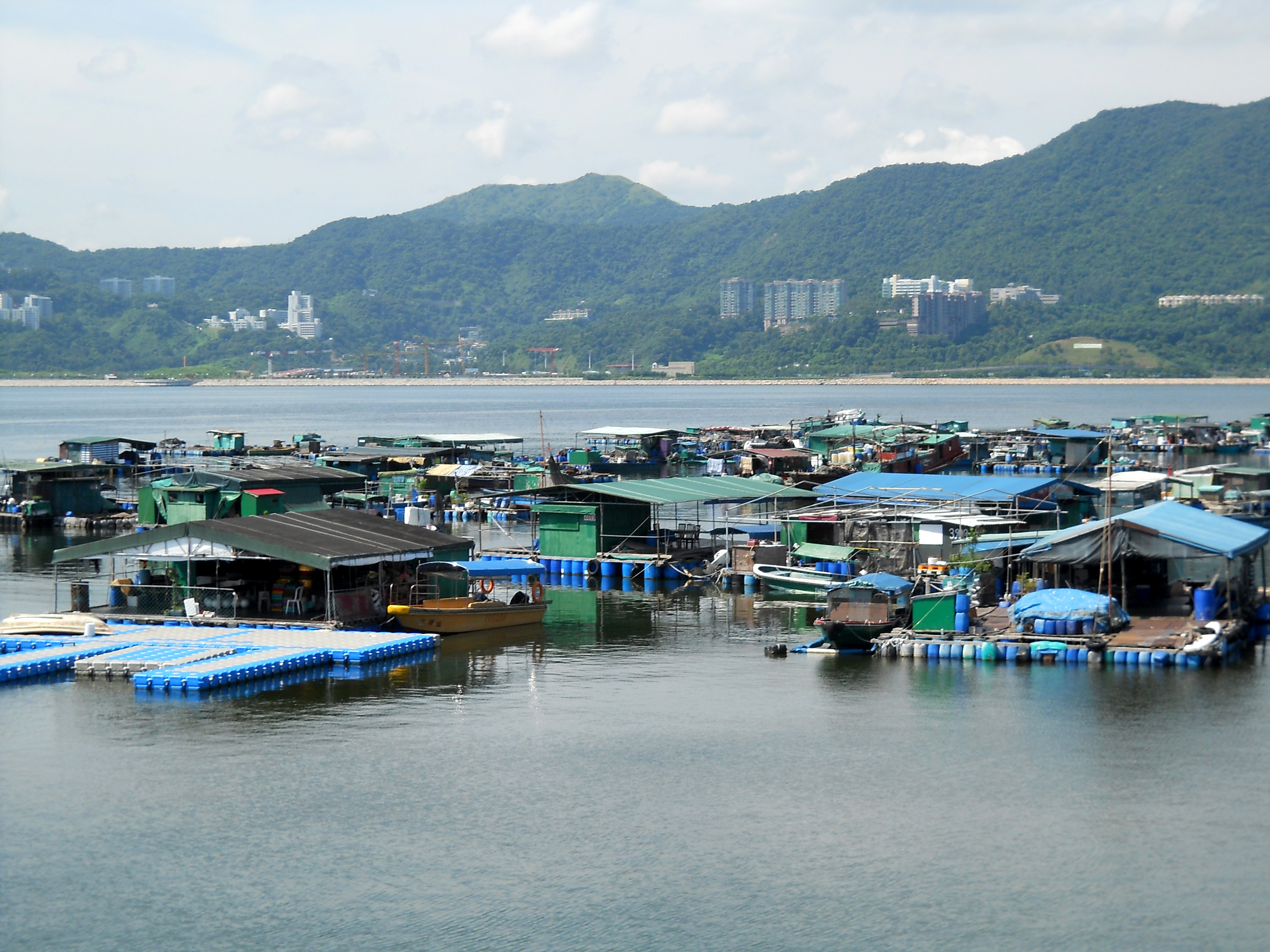
Fish farming at Yim Tin Tsai (Tai Po).

There are 28 designated marine fish culture zones in Hong Kong. Fishermen required to obtain license to operate fish farms inside those zones. The 26 fish culture zones are:

- Sha Tau Kok Hoi
- Ap Chau
- Kat O
- O Pui Tong
- Sai Lau Kong
- Wong Wan
- Tap Mun
- Kau Lau Wan
- Sham Wan
- Lo Fu Wat
- Yung Shue O
- Leung Shuen Wan
- Tiu Cham Wan
- Tai Tau Chau
- Kai Lung Wan
- Kau Sai
- Ma Nam Wat
- Po Toi O
- Po Toi
- Sok Kwu Wan
- Lo Tik Wan
- Ma Wan
- Yim Tin Tsai
- Eastern Yim Tin Tsai, Tai Po District
- Cheung Sha Wan, Lantau Island
- Tung Lung Chau
- Wong Chuk Kok Hoi
- Mirs Bay

Some of the fish rafts have been converted to recreation use. They are located in 11 out of 28 fish culture zones listed above.

==== Pond fish culture ====
The Hong Kong pond fish culture industry is located in the northwestern New Territories. Locations include Nam Sang Wai, Tam Kon Chau, Tai Sang Wai, Lut Chau and Fung Lok Wai.

In 2022, the local inland ponds covered an area of 1,129 ha and produced 2,073 tonnes of freshwater fish. About 92 per cent of the farms were engaged in polyculture (bighead carp, grass carp, common carp and silver carp in combination with tilapia or grey mullet), while the remaining farms practised monoculture of carnivorous species such as giant groupers, seabreams and spotted scat in brackish fish ponds near to the coastline.

== Agricultural development ==
The Agriculture, Fisheries and Conservation Department and its closely related marketing organisations provide infrastructural support and technical services to the various primary industries. The department's crop specialists undertake studies into practical problems in pest control, crop husbandry and soil management. They also investigate specific production technologies to enhance the efficiency and economic benefits of the industry. This work is carried out in an experimental station in Sheung Shui and results are made available to farmers by the department's advisory service.

Agricultural advisory activities are aimed at assisting farmers to improve productivity through the introduction of new and improved produce varieties and production techniques, backed up by adequate credit facilities and efficient and orderly marketing services. Studies are currently under way to adapt and develop greenhouse and organic production technology for local farms. Examples of well-received new produce varieties are: supersweet maize, heat tolerant lettuce, coloured sweet pepper, spaghetti squash, strawberry and white bitter cucumber.

Loans issued to farmers in 2003 amounted to $19 million and the total value of loans issued up to 31 December 2003 (under three separate loan funds administered by the Agriculture, Fisheries and Conservation Department was $505 million. These loans are granted to cover farm production and development purposes.

== See also ==
- Fish Marketing Organisation
- Fishermen villages in Hong Kong
- Hakka people
- Kadoorie Farm and Botanic Garden
- Punti
- Sheung Shui Slaughterhouse
