= Fishermen villages in Hong Kong =

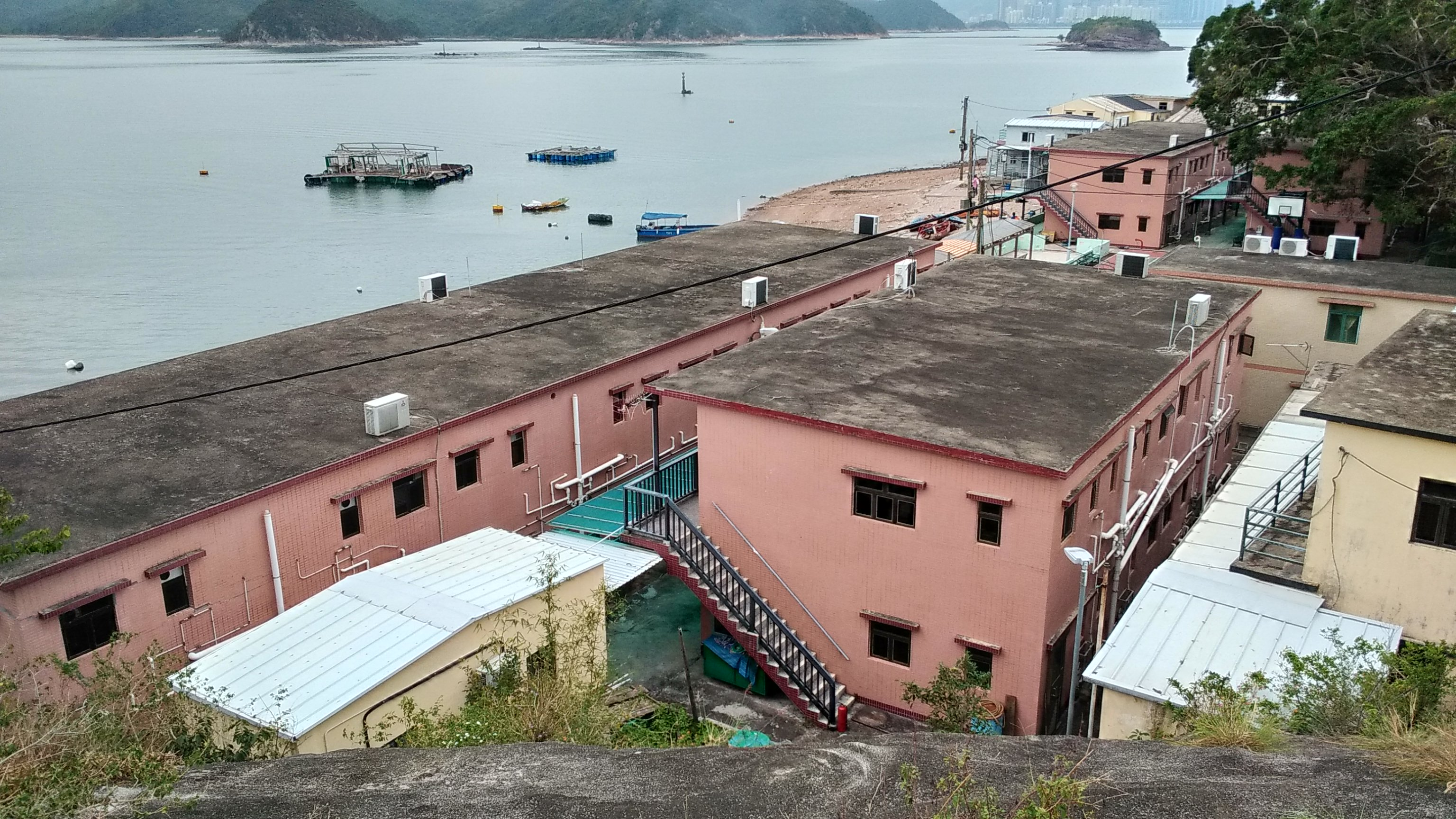
Ap Chau Fishermen's Village.

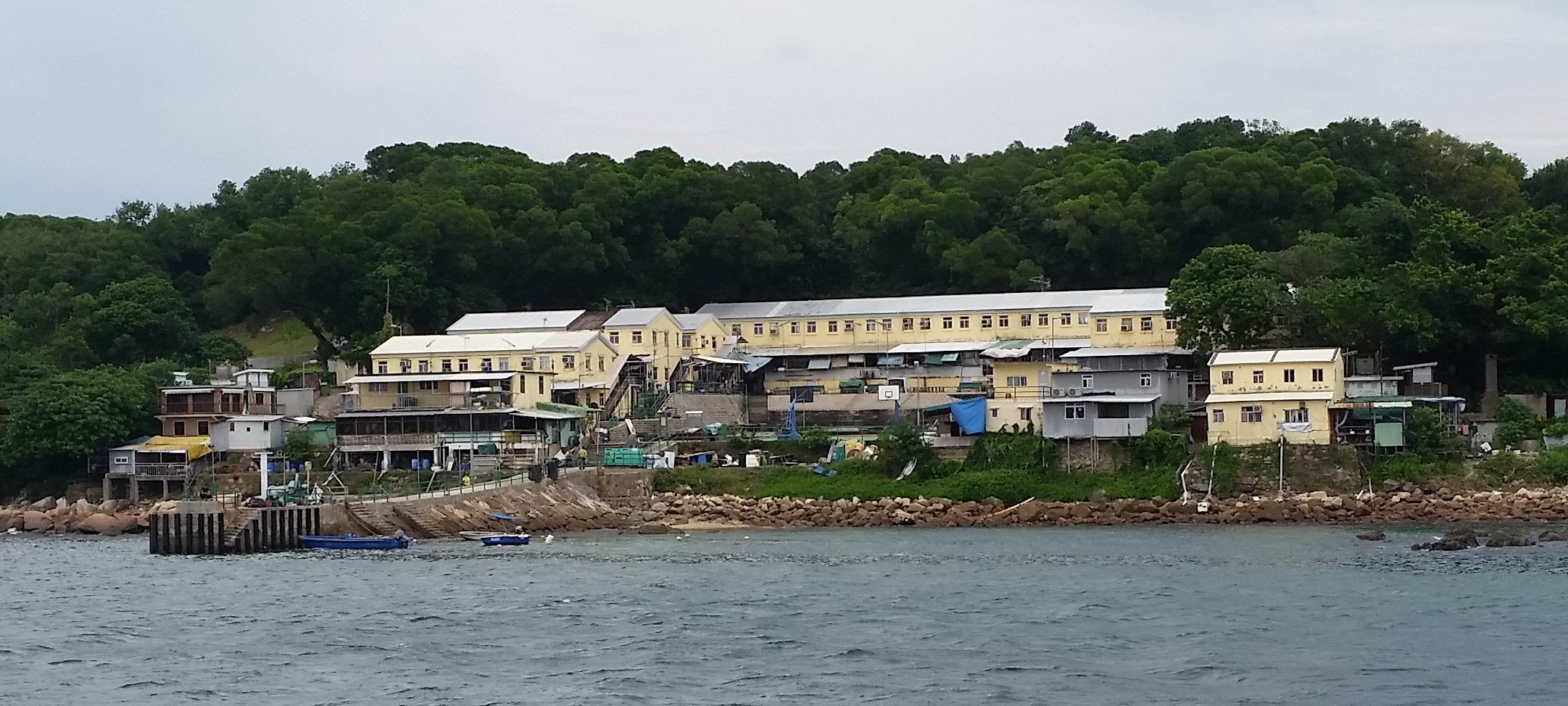
Tap Mun New Fishermen's Village in 2016.

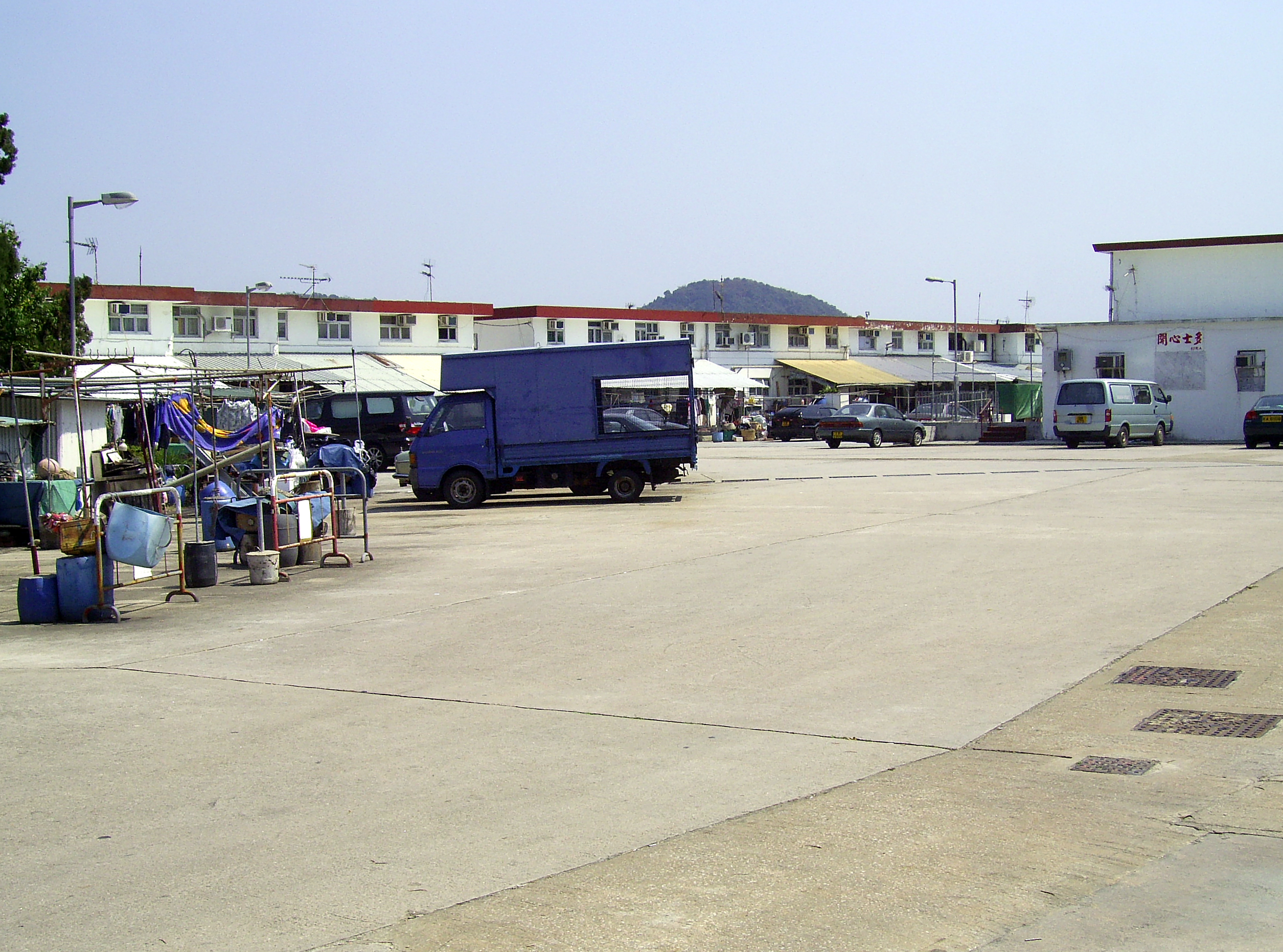
Luen Yick Fishermen Village.

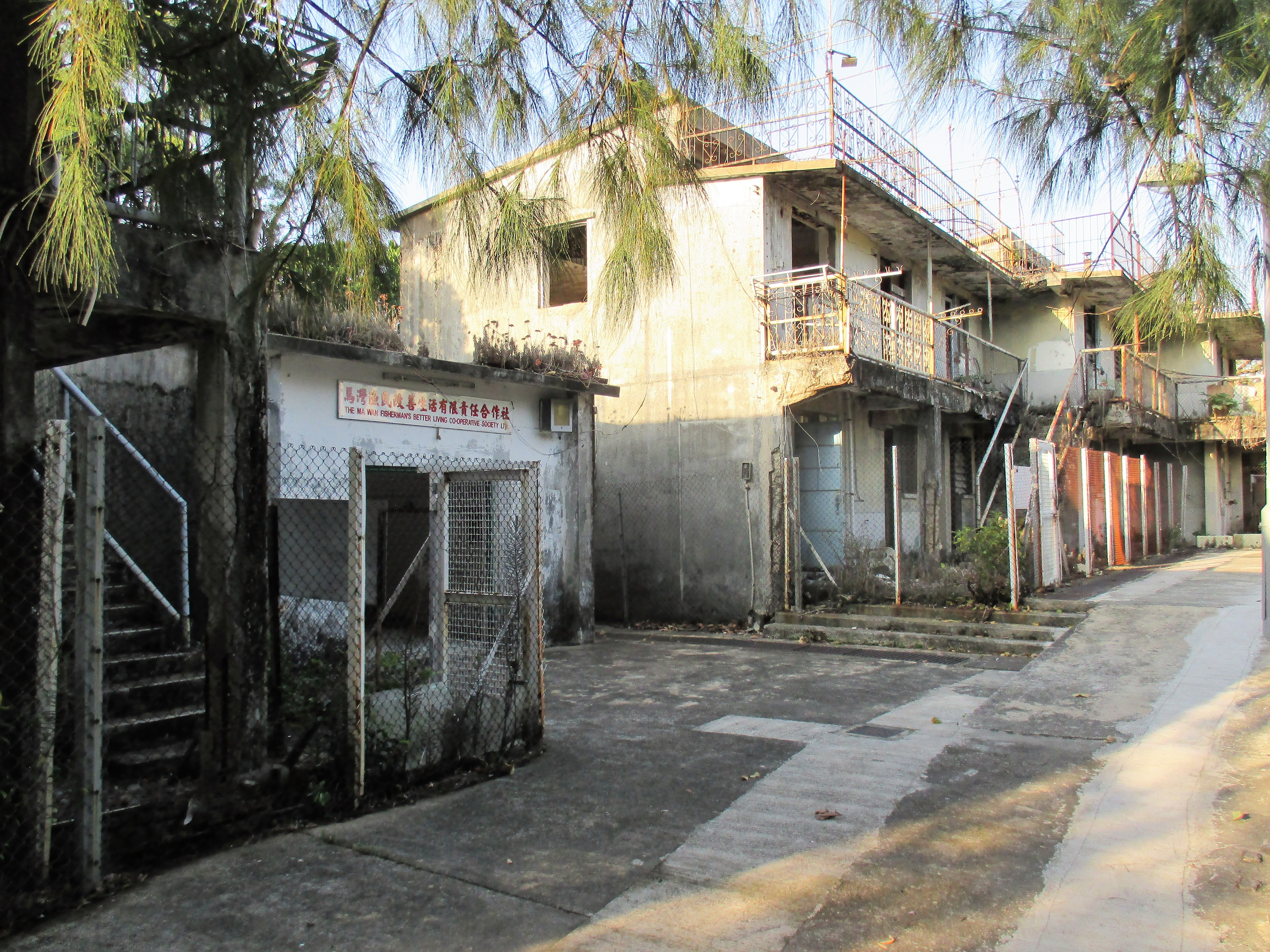
Ma Wan Fishermen's Village in 2017.

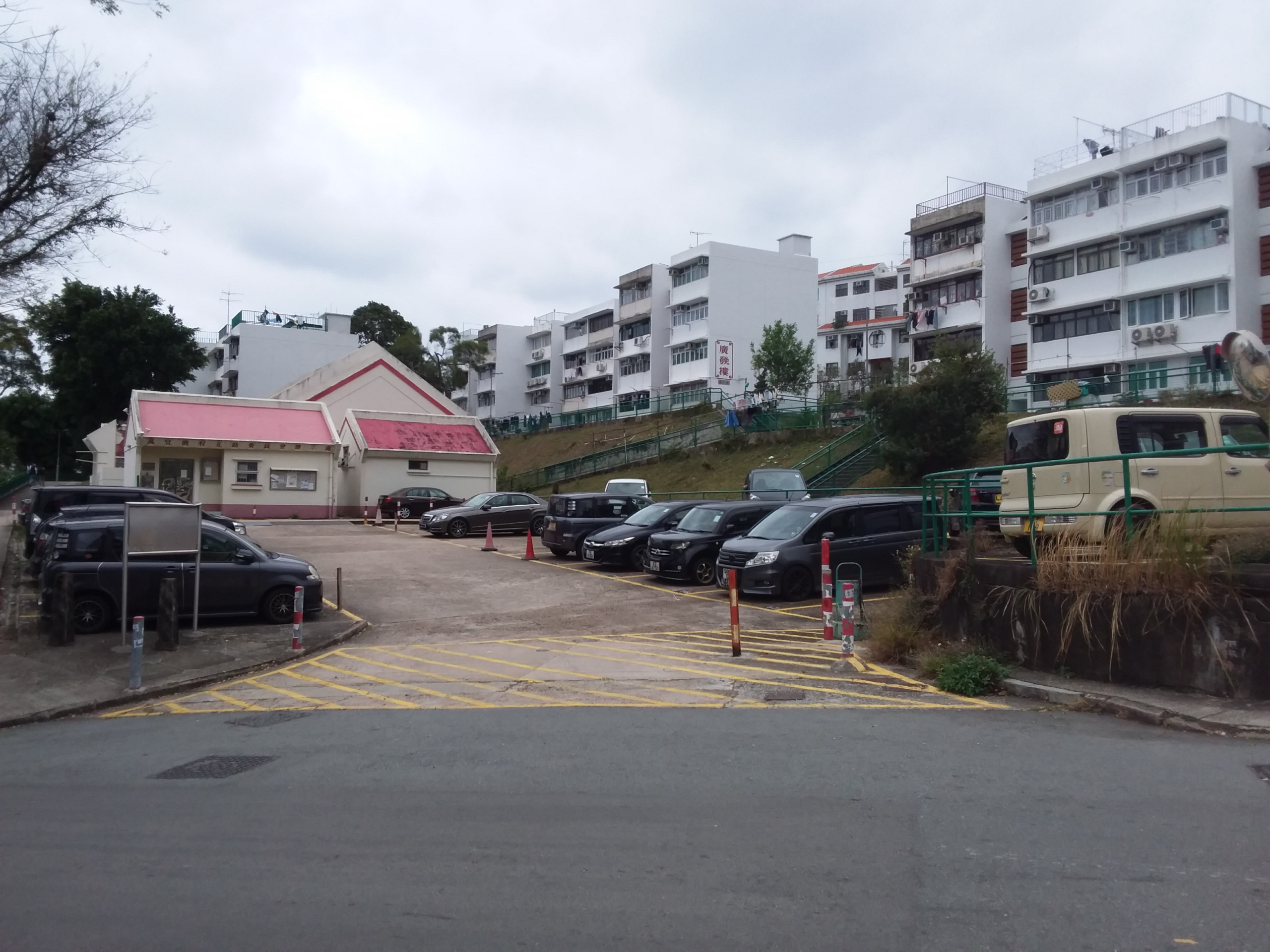
Man Yee Fishermen Estate in 2021.

Several fishermen villages (Chinese: 漁民村) were established in Hong Kong to house fishermen families.

== List of fishermen villages ==
As of 2006, the list of Existing Fishermen Villages was:

North District

- Ap Chau Fishermen's Village (鴨洲漁民村), on Ap Chau. Established in 1960 to improve living conditions

Yuen Long District

- Chung Hau Tsuen (涌口村), in Shan Pui. Established in 1967

Tai Po District

- Tap Mun Fishermen's New Village (門漁民新村), on Tap Mun. Established in 1964 to improve living conditions
- C.A.R.E. New Village (美援新村), in Wong Yi Au, Tai Po Road (near Yuen Chau Tsai). Established in the mid-1960s to the 1970s to re-house fishermen's families who lost their boats during a typhoon
- Sam Mun Tsai Fishermen's New Village (三門仔漁民新村), on Yim Tin Tsai. Established in 1965 to re-house villagers affected by the construction project of Plover Cove Reservoir
- Luen Yick Fishermen Village (聯益漁村), on Yim Tin Tsai. Established in 1975

Tsuen Wan District

- Ma Wan Fishermen's Village (馬灣漁民村), on Ma Wan. Established in 1965 to improve living conditions

Sha Tin District

- Ah Kung Kok Fishermen Village (亞公角漁民新村) in A Kung Kok. Established in 1984 to re-house villagers affected by the reclamation works for building Sha Tin Racecourse and Ma On Shan new town.

Kwai Tsing District

- Tsing Yi Fishermen's New Village (青衣漁民新村), on Tsing Yi. Established in the 1960s and completed in 1965 by a donation of the Cooperative for American Relief Everywhere
- St. Paul's Village (聖保祿村), on Tsing Yi. Established in 1973

Sai Kung District

- Kwun Mun Fishermen Village (官門漁村) in Tui Min Hoi. Established in 1978 to re-house villagers affected by the construction of the High Island Reservoir
- Man Yee Fishermen Village (萬宜漁村) in Tui Min Hoi. Established in 1984 to re-house villagers affected by the construction of the High Island Reservoir
- Shui Bin Tsuen (水邊村), in Hang Hau. Established in the 1970s to improve living conditions
- Tui Min Hoi Fishermen's Village (對面海漁民新村) in Tui Min Hoi. Established in 1963 to improve living conditions
- St. Peter Village (伯多祿村) in Tui Min Hoi. Established in 1964
- Ming Shun Village (明順村) in Tui Min Hoi. Established in 1976
- Tai Ping Village (太平村) in Po Lo Che. Established in the early 1970s

== See also ==
- Housing in Hong Kong
- Agriculture and aquaculture in Hong Kong
