= Ah Kung Kok Fishermen Village =

Human settlement in Hong Kong

Coordinates: 22.402648°N 114.217628°E

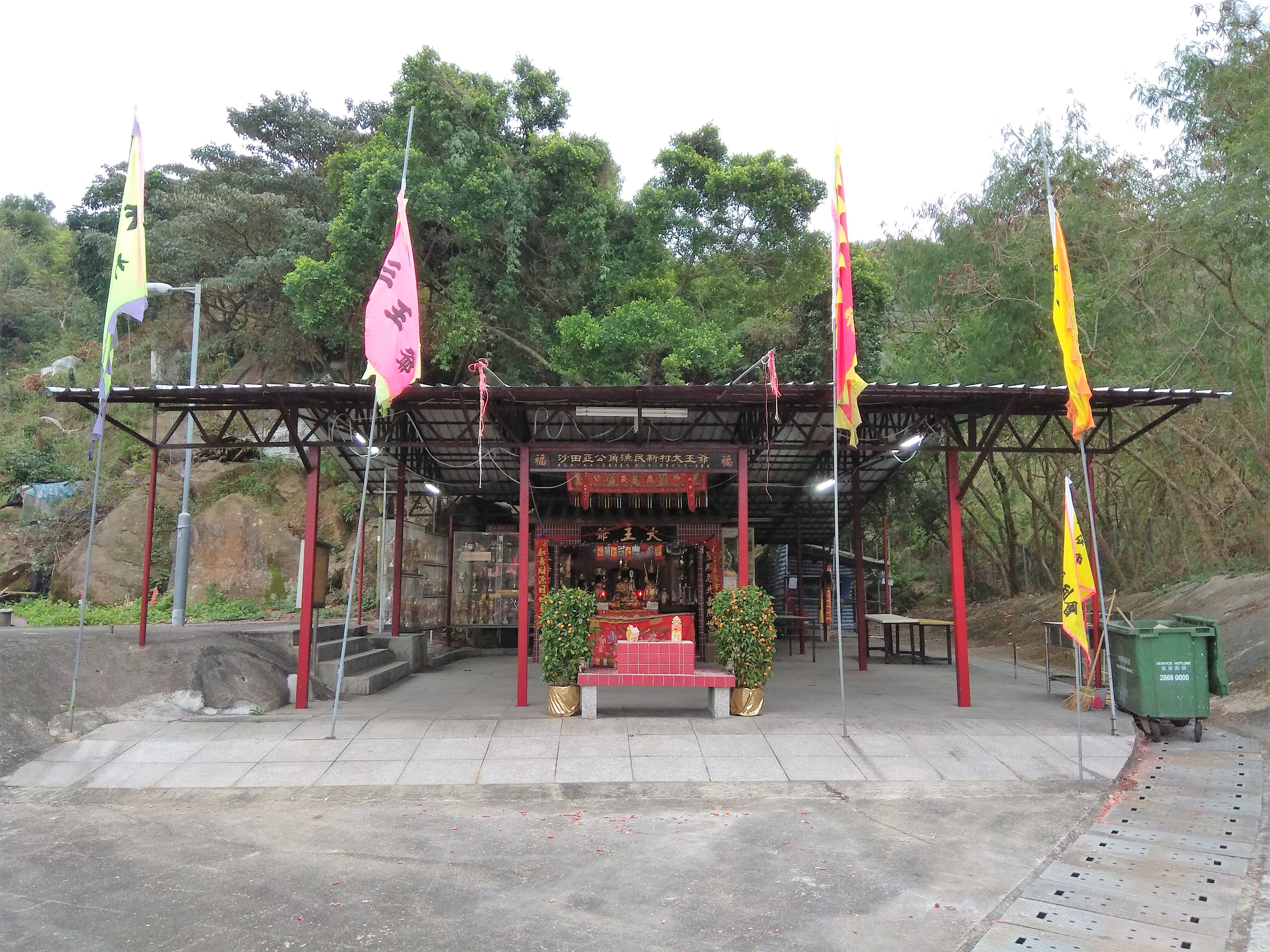
Tai Wong Yeh Temple in Ah Kung Kok Fishermen Village.

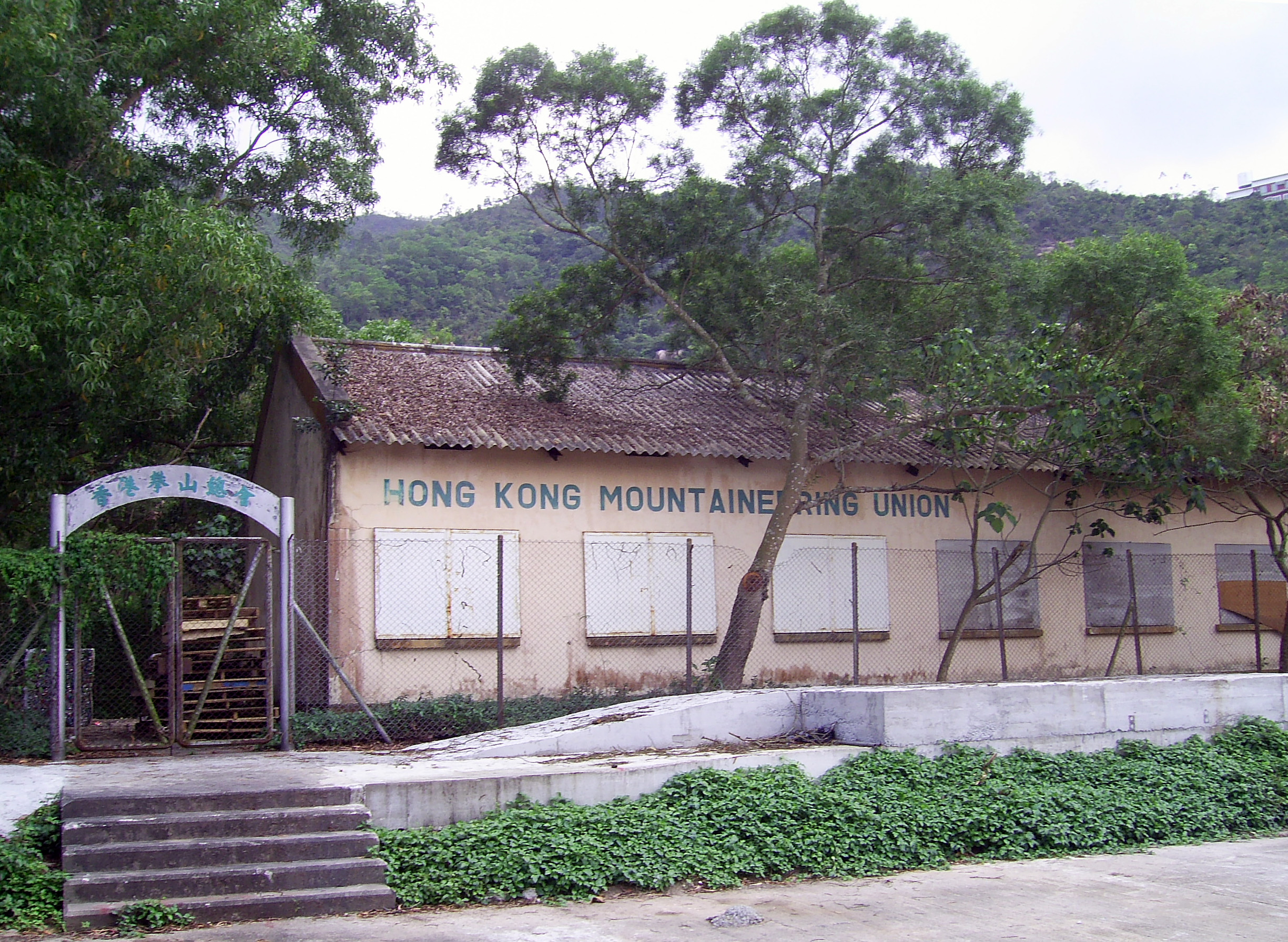
Former Ah Kung Kok Fishermen's Children School.

Ah Kung Kok Fishermen Village (Chinese: 亞公角漁民新村) is a village in Sha Tin District, Hong Kong.

== History ==
Ah Kung Kok Fishermen Village was established in 1984 to re-house villagers affected by the reclamation works for building Sha Tin Racecourse and Ma On Shan new town.

== See also ==
- Fishermen villages in Hong Kong
