= Tsing Yi Fishermen Village and St. Paul's Village =

Coordinates: 22.358042°N 114.104728°E

Tsing Yi Fishermen Village (Chinese: 青衣漁民村) and St. Paul's Village (聖保祿村) are two adjacent villages on Tsing Yi island, in Kwai Tsing District, Hong Kong.

== Administration ==
Fishermen's Village and St. Paul's Village (漁民村及聖保祿村) collectively form one of the villages represented within the Tsing Yi Rural Committee.

== History ==
Tsing Yi Fishermen Village was completed in 1965 to provide residence to fishermen's families relocated from Tsuen Wan. It was built on a slope, originally directly facing the Tsing Yi Typhoon Shelter. It was established by a donation of the Cooperative for American Relief Everywhere.

St. Paul's Village, also a fishermen village, was established in 1973.

== See also ==
- Mun Tsai Tong
- Fishermen villages in Hong Kong
