= On Ho (constituency) =

Hong Kong constituency

- Elected constituency for the Kwai Tsing District Council
- Boundary of On Ho in Kwai Tsing District
- District: Kwai Tsing
- Legislative Council constituency: New Territories South West
- Population: 19,763 (2019)
- Electorate: 12,957 (2019)

Current constituency
- Created: 1994
- Number of members: One
- Member: vacant

On Ho (Chinese: 安灝), previously called Nga On, is one of the 31 constituencies of the Kwai Tsing District, returning one member to the Kwai Tsing District Council every four years. It was first created in 1994.

Loosely based on part of Cheung On Estate and Villa Espalanada in Nga Ying Chau in Tsing Yi, the constituency has an estimated population of 19,763 as of 2019.

== Councillors represented ==
Election	Member	Party
1994	Tam Wai-chun	Nonpartisan
200?	Tam Wai-chun	Liberal
201?	Tam Wai-chun	Independent
2013	Tam Wai-chun	BPA
2019	Warren Tam Ka-chun→vacant	Civic
2020	Warren Tam Ka-chun→vacant	Independent

== Election results ==
=== 2010s ===
Kwai Tsing District Council Election, 2019: On Ho
Party	Candidate	Votes	%	±%
Civic	Warren Tam Ka-chun	5,642	59.57	
BPA	Tam Wai-chun	3,620	38.22	−14.89
Nonpartisan	So Chi-shing	151	1.59	
Nonpartisan	Ng Ka-fai	59	6.23	
Majority		2,022	21.35	
Turnout		9,495	73.33	
Civic gain from BPA		Swing		

Kwai Tsing District Council Election, 2015: On Ho
Party	Candidate	Votes	%	±%
BPA	Tam Wai-chun	3,021	53.11	−11.40
Democratic	Lau Siu-hang	2,667	46.89	+11.40
Majority		354	6.22	
Turnout		5,688	47.48	
BPA hold		Swing		

Kwai Tsing District Council Election, 2011: On Ho
Party	Candidate	Votes	%	±%
Independent	Tam Wai-chun	2,536	64.51	−0.75
Democratic	Ho Chi-wai	1,395	35.49	+0.75
Majority		1,141	29.02	
Turnout		3,931	33.90	
Independent hold		Swing		

=== 2000s ===
Kwai Tsing District Council Election, 2007: On Ho
Party	Candidate	Votes	%	±%
Liberal	Tam Wai-chun	2,525	65.26	+9.02
Democratic	Ho Kwok-leung	1,344	34.74	
Majority		1,181	30.52	
Liberal hold		Swing		

Kwai Tsing District Council Election, 2003: On Ho
Party	Candidate	Votes	%	±%
Nonpartisan	Tam Wai-chun	2,697	46.24	−11.90
DAB	Yip Kwai-bing	1,261	31.86	
Majority		1,436	36.28	
Nonpartisan hold		Swing		

=== 1990s ===
Kwai Tsing District Council Election, 1999: Nga On
Party	Candidate	Votes	%	±%
Nonpartisan	Tam Wai-chun	1,336	46.24	−5.08
Democratic	Lau Pik-kin	931	32.23	
Nonpartisan	Chung Chin-biu	622	21.53	
Majority		55	2.64	
Nonpartisan hold		Swing		

Kwai Tsing District Board Election, 1994: Nga On
Party	Candidate	Votes	%	±%
Nonpartisan	Tam Wai-chun	1,066	51.32	
ADPL	Lee Chi-fai	1,011	48.68	
Majority		55	2.64	
Nonpartisan win (new seat)				
