= Luen Yick Fishermen Village =

Village in Tai Po, Hong Kong

Coordinates: 22.455746°N 114.215097°E

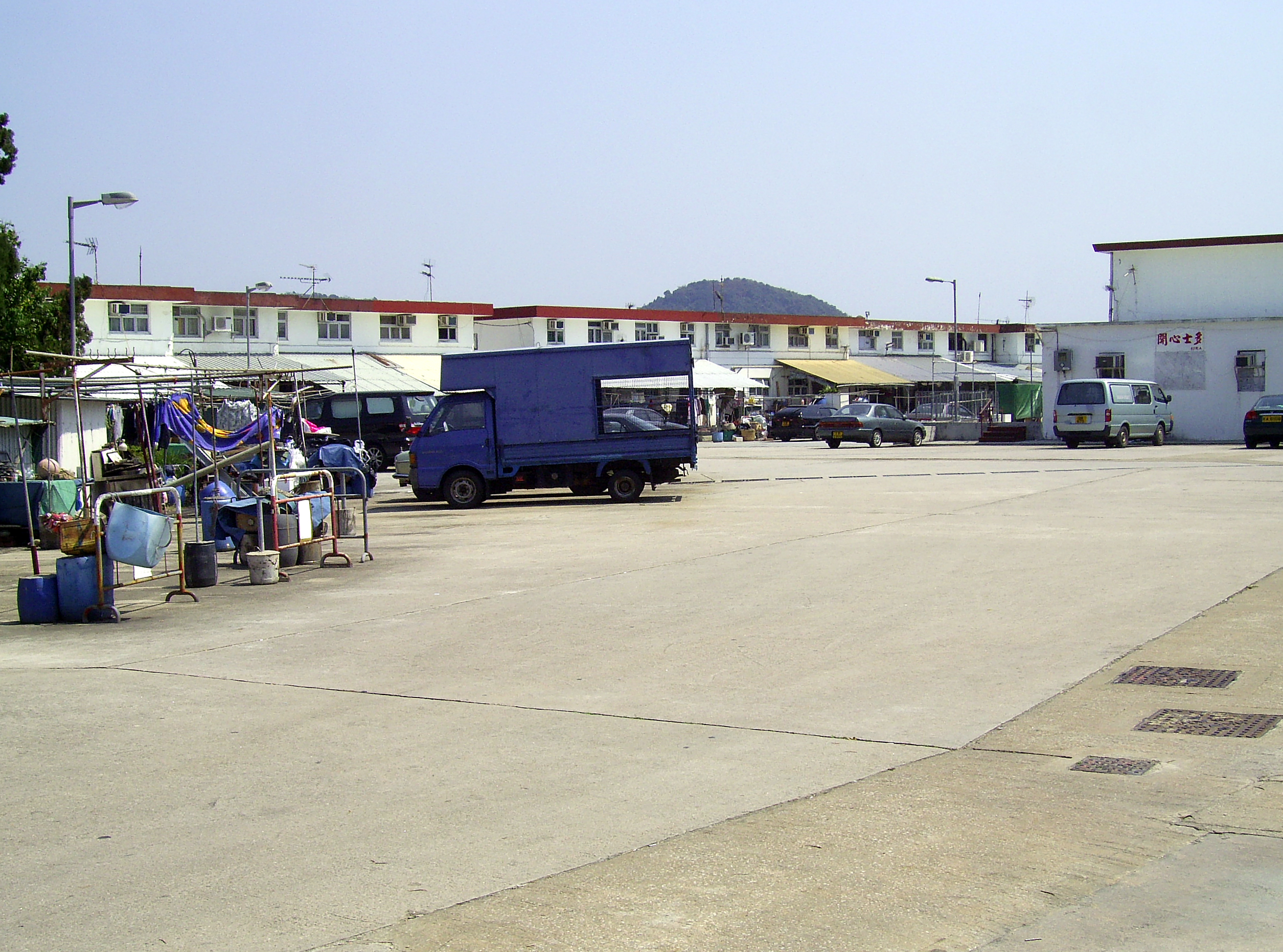
Luen Yick Fishermen Village.

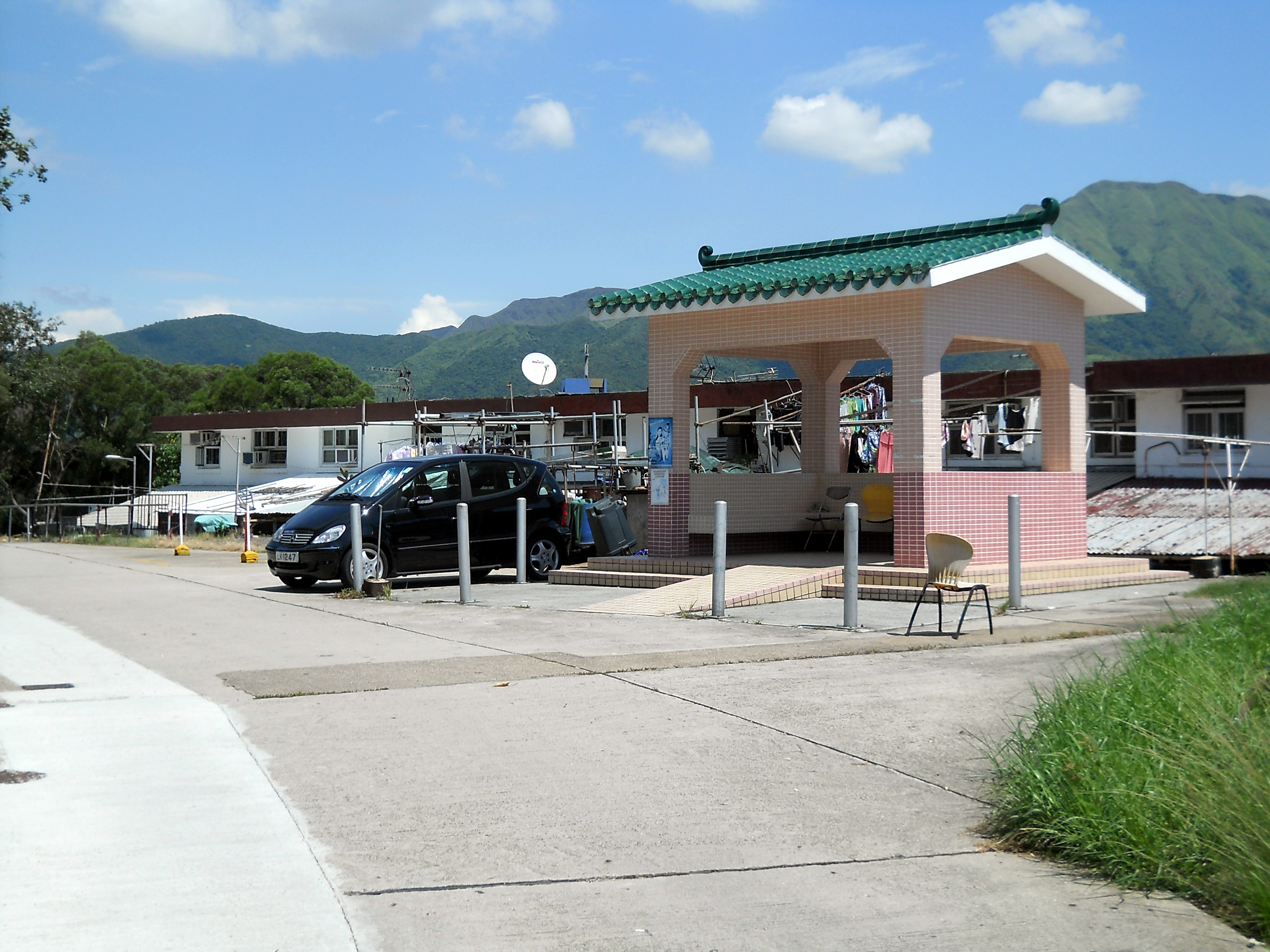
Luen Yick Fishermen Village.

Luen Yick Fishermen Village (Chinese: 聯益漁村) is a village in Yim Tin Tsai, Tai Po District, Hong Kong. Established in 1975, it had an estimated population of around 300 in 2006.

== Administration ==
Luen Yick Fishermen Village is one of the villages represented within the Tai Po Rural Committee. For electoral purposes, Luen Yick Fishermen Village is part of the Shuen Wan constituency, which was formerly represented by So Tat-leung until October 2021.

== See also ==
- Fishermen villages in Hong Kong
