= Cheung On (constituency) =

Constituency of the Kwai Tsing District Council in Hong Kong

- Elected constituency for the Kwai Tsing District Council
- Boundary of Cheung On in Kwai Tsing District
- District: Kwai Tsing
- Legislative Council constituency: New Territories South West
- Population: 12,739 (2019)
- Electorate: 10,075 (2019)

Current constituency
- Created: 1991
- Number of members: One
- Member: vacant

Cheung On (Chinese: 長安) is one of the 31 constituencies of the Kwai Tsing District Council in Hong Kong. The seat elects one member of the council every four years. It was first created in the 1994 elections. Its boundary is loosely based on part of Cheung On Estate in Tsing Yi with an estimated population of 12,739.

== Councillors represented ==
Election	Member	Party
1991	Chiu Wah-shing	TYCG
1994	Chiu Wah-shing	Nonpartisan
2003	Lau Pik-kin	Democratic
2007	Law King-shing	DAB
2019	Cheung Man-lung→vacant	Independent democrat

== Election results ==
=== 2010s ===
Kwai Tsing District Council Election, 2019: Cheung On
Party	Candidate	Votes	%	±%
PfD	Cheung Man-lung	3,711	53.14	
DAB	Law King-shing	2,983	42.72	
Independent	Tong Yik-chun	289	4.14	
Majority		728	10.42	
Turnout		8,977	72.17	
PfD gain from DAB		Swing		
