= Lo Tik Wan =

Coordinates: 22.223651°N 114.125233°E

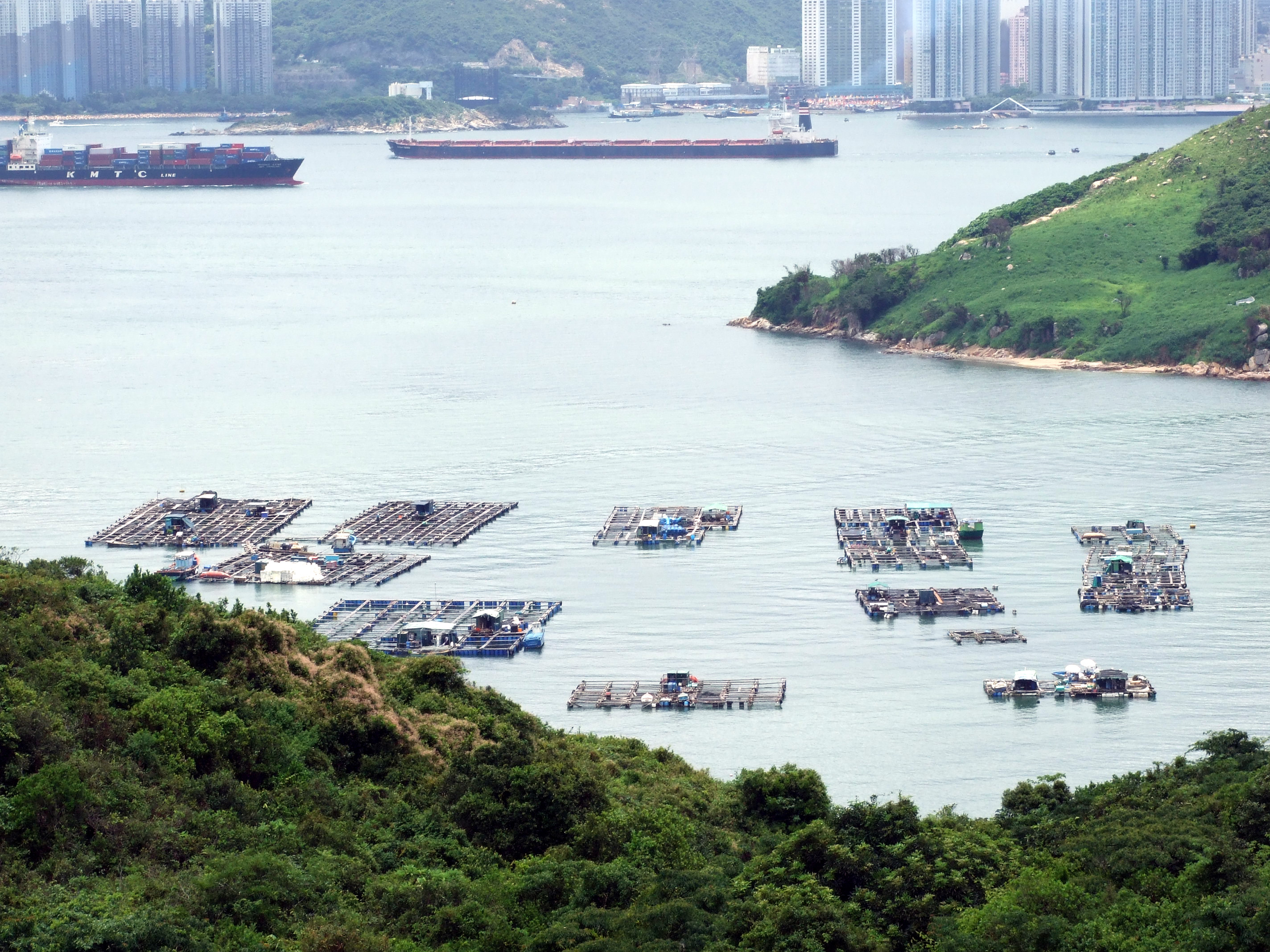
Fish farming at Lo Tik Wan.

Lo Tik Wan (Chinese: 蘆荻灣) is a village on Lamma Island, the third largest island in the territory of Hong Kong.

== Administration ==
Lo Tik Wan is a recognized village under the New Territories Small House Policy.

== Economy ==
Lo Tik Wan is one of the 26 designated marine fish culture zones in Hong Kong.
