= Yau Kom Tau (Tsing Yi) =

Place on Tsing Yi Island, Hong Kong

Coordinates: 22.3609°N 114.0928°E

Yau Kom Tau 油柑頭
- Urban
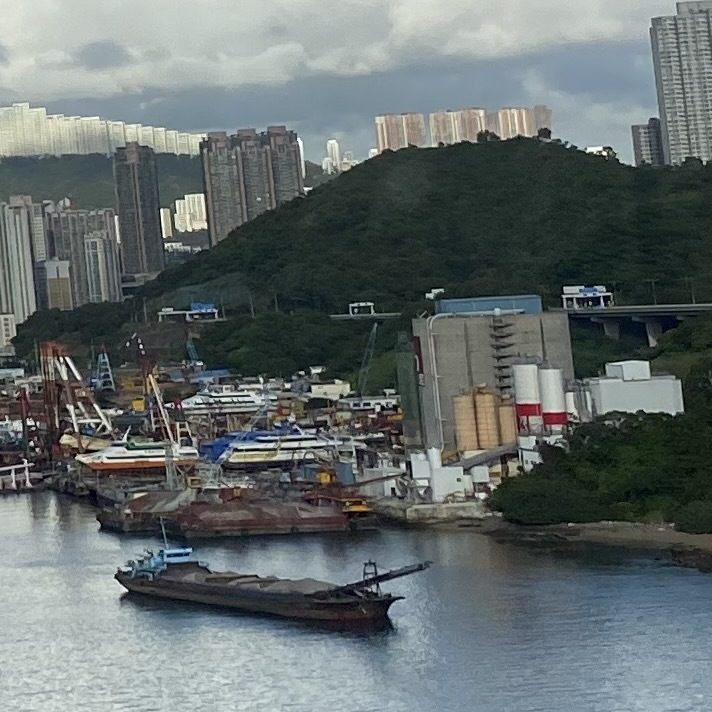
- Yau Kom Tau, viewing from Ting Kau Bridge
- Interactive map of Yau Kom Tau

Yau Kom Tau (Chinese: 油柑頭) is an industrial area with farmlands situated in a valley on the north shore of Tsing Yi Island in Hong Kong. The area is largely occupied by shipyards, which was relocated from the site of what is now Tsing Yi Northeast Park in order to resolve noise nuisance affecting residents of Ching Tai Court and Cheung On Estate. At the end of Tam Kon Shan Road stands a cement plant, namely Hong Kong Cement Tsing Yi Plant, at No. 100, while The Hong Kong Shipyard is at No. 98, its address given as Ngau Kok Wan.

It originally was a flat headland formed by a small hill with a bay, Ngau Kok Wan (牛角灣), on its east and a valley and a swamp on its west. Its natural shoreline was reclaimed for the relocation of shipyards from Cheung Sha Wan. There are only two roads, Tam Kon Shan Road and Tsing Yi North Coastal Road on the headland.
