= Ginger lily =

Ginger Lily is a common name for several plants and may refer to:

- Alpinia
- Hedychium
