= Tui Min Hoi =

Village of Hong Kong

Coordinates: 22.377437°N 114.271177°E

Tui Min Hoi (Chinese: 對面海; lit. 'over the harbour') is an area and a village of Sai Kung District, Hong Kong, located in the vicinity of Sai Kung Town.

== Administration ==
Tui Min Hoi is a recognized village under the New Territories Small House Policy.

== History ==
Tui Min Hoi was originally called Tsiu Lung (蕉壟). It was established in the early 19th century as a scattered coastal Hakka village.

The houses at Nos. 5 & 6 Tui Min Hoi form a pair of semi-detached village houses. They were built in 1933, replacing an earlier village house.
