= Walla-walla =

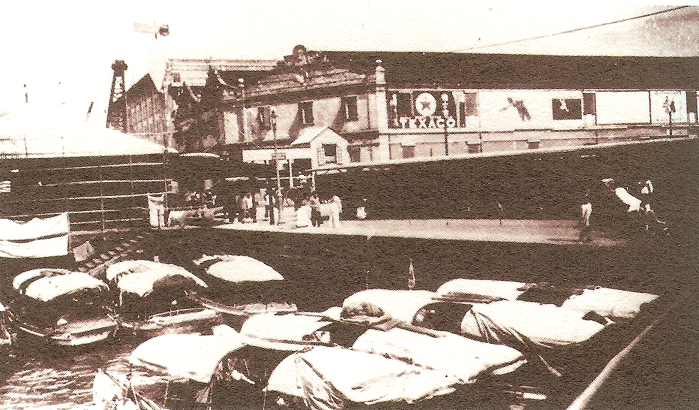
Motorboats parked at pier around 1920.

Walla-walla (Chinese: 嘩啦嘩啦) was a kind of motorboat serving in the Victoria Harbour of Hong Kong. It was the major means of transport between Hong Kong Island and Kowloon before Star Ferry got the license to operate the cross-harbour ferry service. Long after Star Ferry had started to provide the service, it was still an important auxiliary transport, as it was the only means that one could cross the harbour when Star Ferry had stopped the service from 1:30 am to 6:30 am. It started to lose its importance and completed its historical mission after the Cross-Harbour Tunnel had opened in 1972.

Walla-walla was named by European passengers for its very noisy engine. The local people referred to it as tin suen tsai (電船仔, literally "small electric boat") or also walla-walla.
