= Cheung On Estate =

Public housing estate in Tsing Yi Island, Hong Kong

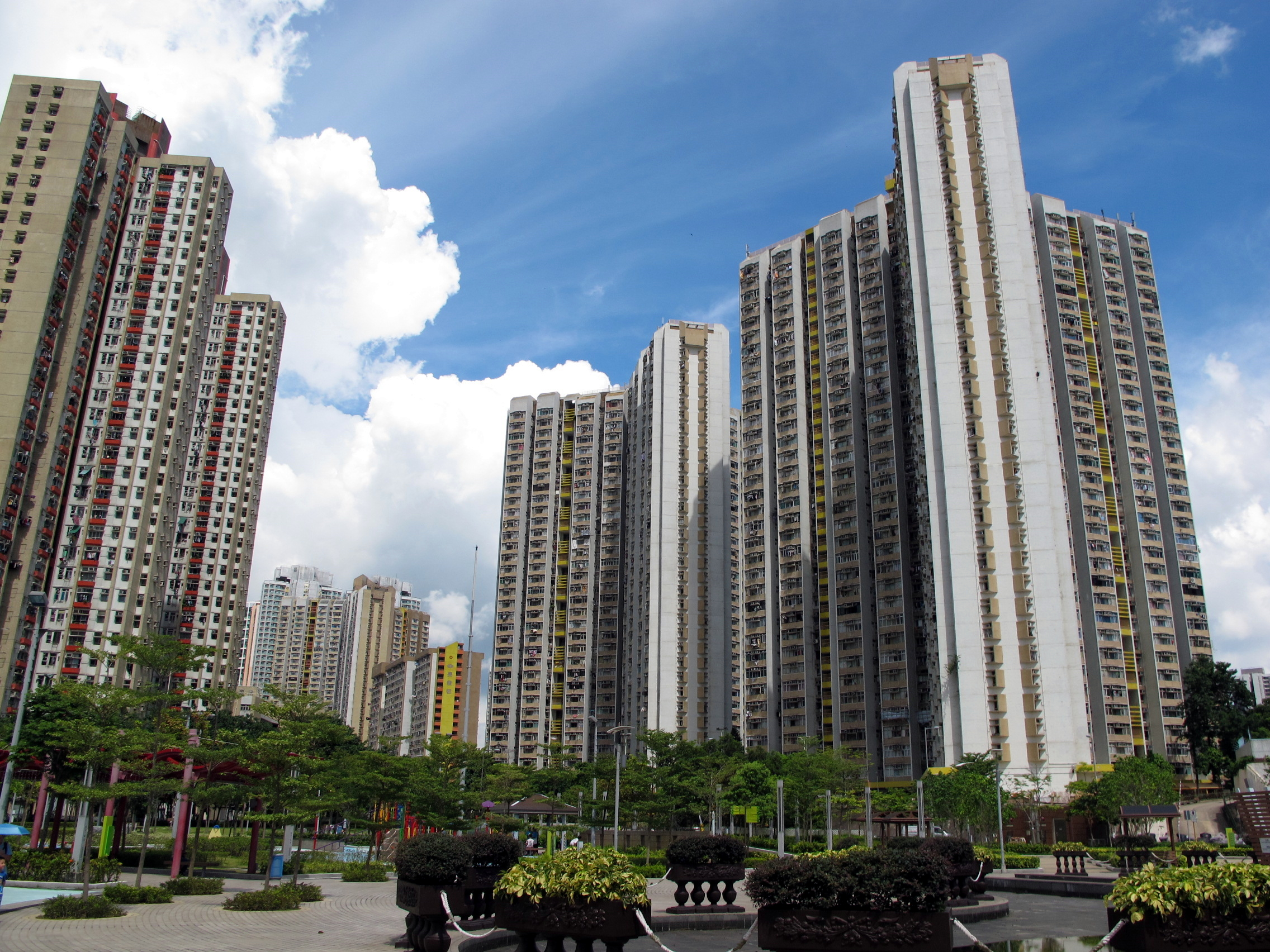
- Cheung On Estate
- Interactive map of Cheung On Estate

General information
- Location: 1 Tam Kon Shan Road, Tsing Yi; New Territories, Hong Kong
- Coordinates: 22.3611°N 114.1038°E
- Status: Completed
- Category: Public rental housing
- Population: 21,791 (2016)
- No. of blocks: 10
- No. of units: 7,338

Construction
- Constructed: 1987; 39 years ago
- Authority: Hong Kong Housing Authority

Cheung On Estate (Chinese: 長安邨) is a public housing estate in Tsing Yi Island, New Territories, Hong Kong built partly on the former peninsula of Tam Kon Shan and partly on the reclaimed land of Mun Tsai Tong in Tsing Yi North near Tsing Yi Northeast Park and MTR Tsing Yi station. It consists of ten residential blocks completed between 1987 and 1989. Among 7,338 flats in the estate, 5,617 flats have been sold to the residents under the TPS Phase 1 since January 1998.

== Houses ==
Name	Chinese name	Building type	Completed
On Chiu House	安潮樓	Trident 3	1989
On Pak House	安泊樓	Trident 3	1989
On Hoi House	安海樓	Trident 3	1988
On Yeung House	安洋樓	Trident 3	1988
On Mei House	安湄樓	Trident 3	1988
On Yun House	安潤樓	Linear 1	1988
On Ching House	安清樓	Linear 1	1988
On Wu House	安湖樓	New Slab	1988
On Tao House	安濤樓	New Slab	1987
On Kong House	安江樓	Trident 3	1987

== Demographics ==
According to the 2016 by-census, Cheung On Estate had a population of 21,791. The median age was 48.4 and the majority of residents (96.1 per cent) were of Chinese ethnicity. The average household size was 3 people. The median monthly household income of all households (i.e. including both economically active and inactive households) was HK$30,600.

== Politics ==
For the 2019 District Council election, the estate fell within two constituencies. Most of the estate is located in the Cheung On constituency, which was formerly represented by Cheung Man-lung until July 2021, while the remainder of the estate falls within the On Ho constituency, which was formerly represented by Warren Tam Ka-chun until July 2021.

== See also ==
- Public housing estates on Tsing Yi Island
