= Mun Tsai Tong =

Harbour in Hong Kong

Coordinates: 22.3621°N 114.1030°E

- Traditional Chinese: 門仔塘
Transcriptions
Hakka
- Romanization: mun2 zai3 tong2
Yue: Cantonese
- Jyutping: mun4 zai2 tong4

Mun Tsai Tong or Moon Tsai Tong (Chinese: 門仔塘) was a harbour located between northeast Tsing Yi Island and Nga Ying Chau in Hong Kong. It was reclaimed for the development of a new town on Tsing Yi Island in the 1980s. The harbour became two public housing estates, Cheung On Estate and Cheung Fat Estate.

The harbour once protected the boats of fishermen and boat-people that were affected by the reclamation of Tsuen Wan and Kwai Chung areas. They were forced to leave again when reclamation on the harbour started. CARE and Caritas Hong Kong built homes for them in the nearby hill, namely Tsing Yi Fishermen Village (青衣漁民村) and St. Paul's Village (聖保祿村). Tsing Yi Fishermen's Children's School was established by the Fish Marketing Organisation above the hill nearby on the Tsing Yi Island.
