= Tsing Yi South (constituency) =

Hong Kong constituency

- Elected constituency for the Kwai Tsing District Council
- Boundary of Tsing Yi South in Kwai Tsing District
- District: Kwai Tsing
- Legislative Council constituency: New Territories South West
- Population: 17,278 (2019)
- Electorate: 11,416 (2019)

Current constituency
- Created: 1985
- Number of members: One
- Member: vacant

Tsing Yi South is one of the 31 constituencies of the Kwai Tsing District Council. The seat elects one member of the council every four years. It was first created in the 1985 elections. Its boundary is loosely based on the southern part of Tsing Yi including residential areas such as Cheung Wang Estate, Mounts Haven, Rambler Crest and Tsing Yi South Industrial Area.

== Councillors represented ==
Election	Member	Party
1985	Li Chi-fai	TYCG
1989 by-election	Tse Wai-ming	TYCG
1990	Tse Wai-ming	United Democrat
1994	Au Cheong-wa	ADPL
2003	Wong Kwong-mo	Democratic
2007	Poon Chi-shing	DAB
2019	Kwok Tsz-kin→vacant	Independent democrat

== Election results ==
=== 2010s ===
Kwai Tsing District Council Election, 2019: Tsing Yi South
Party	Candidate	Votes	%	±%
PfD	Kwok Tsz-kin	4,662	54.46	
DAB	Poon Chi-shing	3,899	45.54	−20.48
Majority		763	8.92	
Turnout		8,578	75.23	
PfD gain from DAB		Swing		

Kwai Tsing District Council Election, 2015: Tsing Yi South
Party	Candidate	Votes	%	±%
DAB	Poon Chi-shing	3,214	66.02	
Youngspiration	Jonathan Ip Yam-shek	1,654	33.98	
Majority		1,560	32.04	
Turnout		4,868	51.91	
DAB hold		Swing		

Kwai Tsing District Council Election, 2011: Tsing Yi South
Party	Candidate	Votes	%	±%
DAB	Poon Chi-shing	Unopposed		
DAB hold		Swing		

=== 2000s ===
Kwai Tsing District Council Election, 2007: Tsing Yi South
Party	Candidate	Votes	%	±%
DAB	Poon Chi-shing	1,771	61.37	+30.18
Democratic	Wong Kwong-mo	1,115	38.63	−1.93
Majority		656	22.74	
DAB gain from Democratic		Swing	+16.06	

Kwai Tsing District Council Election, 2003: Tsing Yi South
Party	Candidate	Votes	%	±%
Democratic	Wong Kwong-mo	1,650	40.56	
DAB	Poon Chi-shing	1,269	31.19	
ADPL	Au Cheong-wa	1,149	28.24	
Majority		381	9.37	
Democratic gain from ADPL		Swing		

=== 1990s ===
Kwai Tsing District Council Election, 1999: Tsing Yi South
Party	Candidate	Votes	%	±%
ADPL	Au Cheong-wa	Uncontested		
ADPL hold		Swing		

Kwai Tsing District Board Election, 1994: Tsing Yi South
Party	Candidate	Votes	%	±%
ADPL	Au Cheong-wa	1,410	70.15	
Nonpartisan	Lau Po-kwan	600	29.85	
Majority		810	40.30	
ADPL gain from Democratic		Swing	{{{swing}}}	

Kwai Tsing District Board Election, 1991: Tsing Yi South
Party	Candidate	Votes	%	±%
United Democrats	Tse Wai-ming	2,060	70.14	−15.79
LDF	Lui Ho-wai	877	29.86	
Majority		1,183	40.28	
United Democrats hold		Swing		

=== 1980s ===
Tsing Yi South by-election 1989
Party	Candidate	Votes	%	±%
TYCG	Tse Wai-ming	1,108	73.47	−12.46
Nonpartisan	Chan Kiu-on	400	26.53	
Majority		708	46.94	
TYCG hold		Swing		

Kwai Tsing District Board Election, 1988: Tsing Yi South
Party	Candidate	Votes	%	±%
TYCG	Li Chi-fai	3,077	85.93	+11.65
Nonpartisan	Chan Wai-hon	504	14.07	
Majority		2,573	71.86	
TYCG hold		Swing		

Kwai Chung and Tsing Yi District Board Election, 1985: Tsing Yi South
Party	Candidate	Votes	%	±%
TYCG	Li Chi-fai	2,862	74.28	
Nonpartisan	Lee Man-keung	603	15.65	
Nonpartisan	Tang Ping-hung	388	10.07	
Majority		2,259	58.63	(new)
TYCG win (new seat)				
