= Tsing Yi Estate (constituency) =

Hong Kong constituency

- Elected constituency for the Kwai Tsing District Council
- Boundary of Tsing Yi Estate in Kwai Tsing District
- District: Kwai Tsing
- Legislative Council constituency: New Territories South West
- Population: 15,419 (2019)
- Electorate: 11,216 (2019)

Current constituency
- Created: 1994
- Number of members: One
- Member: vacant

Tsing Yi Estate (Chinese: 青衣邨) is one of the 31 constituencies of the Kwai Tsing District Council in Hong Kong. The seat elects one member of the council every four years. It was first created in the 1994 elections. Its boundary is loosely based on part of Greenview Villa, Tsing Yi Estate and Tsing Yi Garden in Tsing Yi with estimated population of 15,419.

== Councillors represented ==
Election	Member	Party
1994	Simon Chan Siu-man	ADPL/TYCG
199?	Simon Chan Siu-man	Nonpartisan
2019	Wong Pit-man→vacant	Tsing Yi People

== Election results ==
=== 2010s ===
Kwai Tsing District Council Election, 2019: Tsing Yi Estate
Party	Candidate	Votes	%	±%
Tsing Yi People (PfD)	Wong Pit-man	4,727	59.68	
Independent	Simon Chan Siu-man	3,194	40.32	
Majority		1,533	19.36	
Turnout		7,952	70.94	
Tsing Yi People hold		Swing		
