= Tsing Yi Estate =

Public housing estate in Tsing Yi Island, Hong Kong

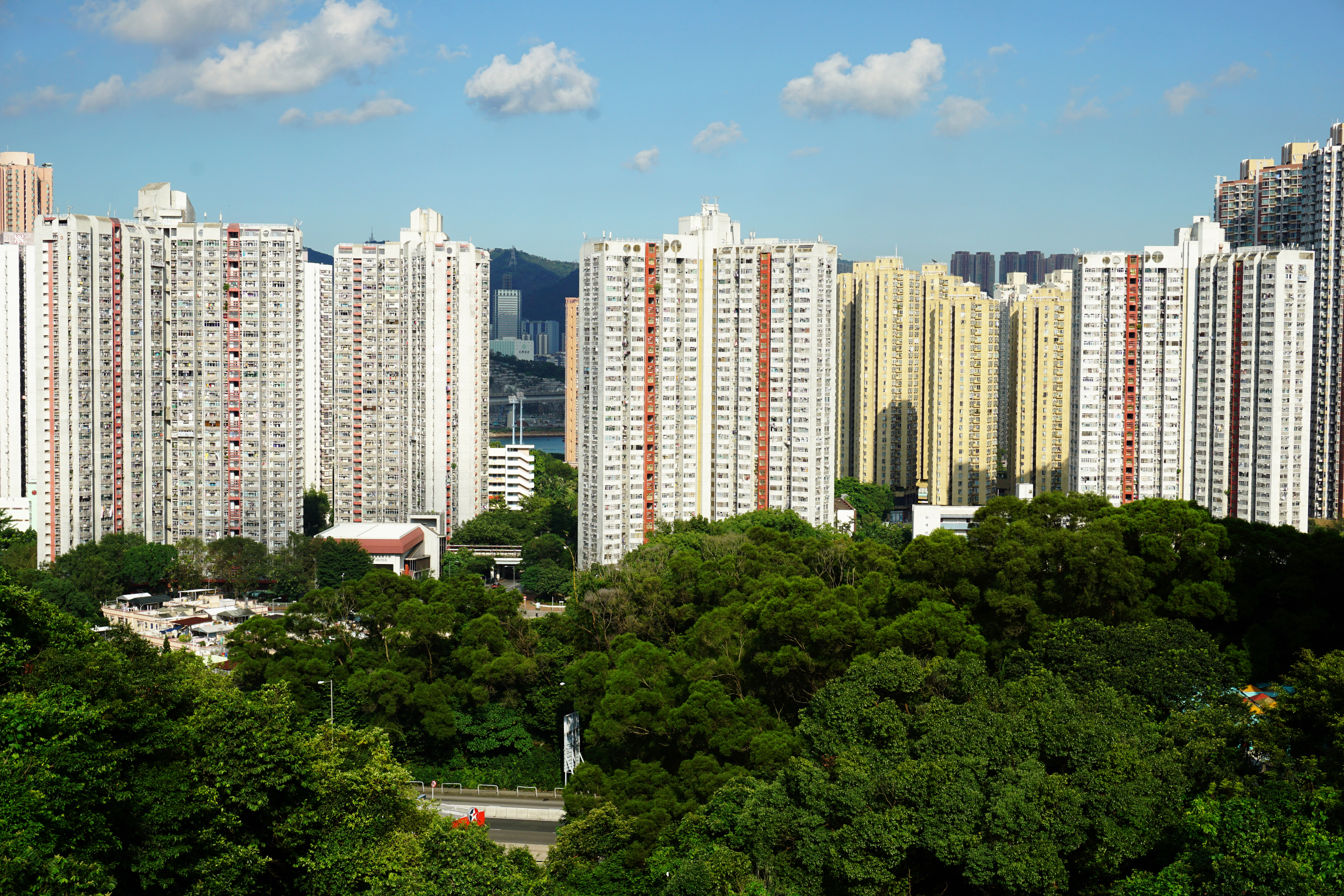
- Tsing Yi Estate
- Interactive map of Tsing Yi Estate

General information
- Location: 10 Fung Shue Wo Road, Tsing Yi; New Territories, Hong Kong
- Coordinates: 22.3553725°N 114.1033258°E
- Status: Completed
- Category: Public rental housing
- Population: 8,783 (2016)
- No. of blocks: 4
- No. of units: 930

Construction
- Constructed: 1986; 40 years ago
- Authority: Hong Kong Housing Authority

Tsing Yi (Tsing Yi Estate; Chinese: 青衣邨) is a public housing estate in Tsing Yi Island, New Territories, Hong Kong near Fung Shue Wo Sports Centre and Tsing Yi Park. It is the only public housing estate on Tsing Yi Island which name does not start with the character Cheung (長). This is because the estate was named in the memory of Tsing Yi Town (青衣墟), a traditional market town which was demolished in the 1980s to make way for new town developments. Since the estate was situated at the seaside of old Tsing Yi Town, part of it is built on reclaimed land. The estate consists of four residential blocks completed in 1986 and 1989 respectively.

== Houses ==
Name	Chinese name	Building type	Completed
Yee Kui House	宜居樓	Trident 2	1986
Yee Yip House	宜業樓	Trident 2	1986
Yee Wai House	宜偉樓	Trident 3	1989
Yee Yat House	宜逸樓	Trident 4	1989

== Demographics ==
According to the 2016 by-census, Tsing Yi Estate had a population of 8,783. The median age was 46.7 and the majority of residents (98.1 per cent) were of Chinese ethnicity. The average household size was 2.8 people. The median monthly household income of all households (i.e. including both economically active and inactive households) was HK$28,490.

== Politics ==
Tsing Yi Estate is located in Tsing Yi Estate constituency of the Kwai Tsing District Council. It was formerly represented by Wong Pit-man, who was elected in the 2019 elections until July 2021.

== See also ==
- Public housing estates on Tsing Yi Island
