= Tsing Yi Park =

Public park in Tsing Yi, Hong Kong

Coordinates: 22°21′21″N 114°06′21″E

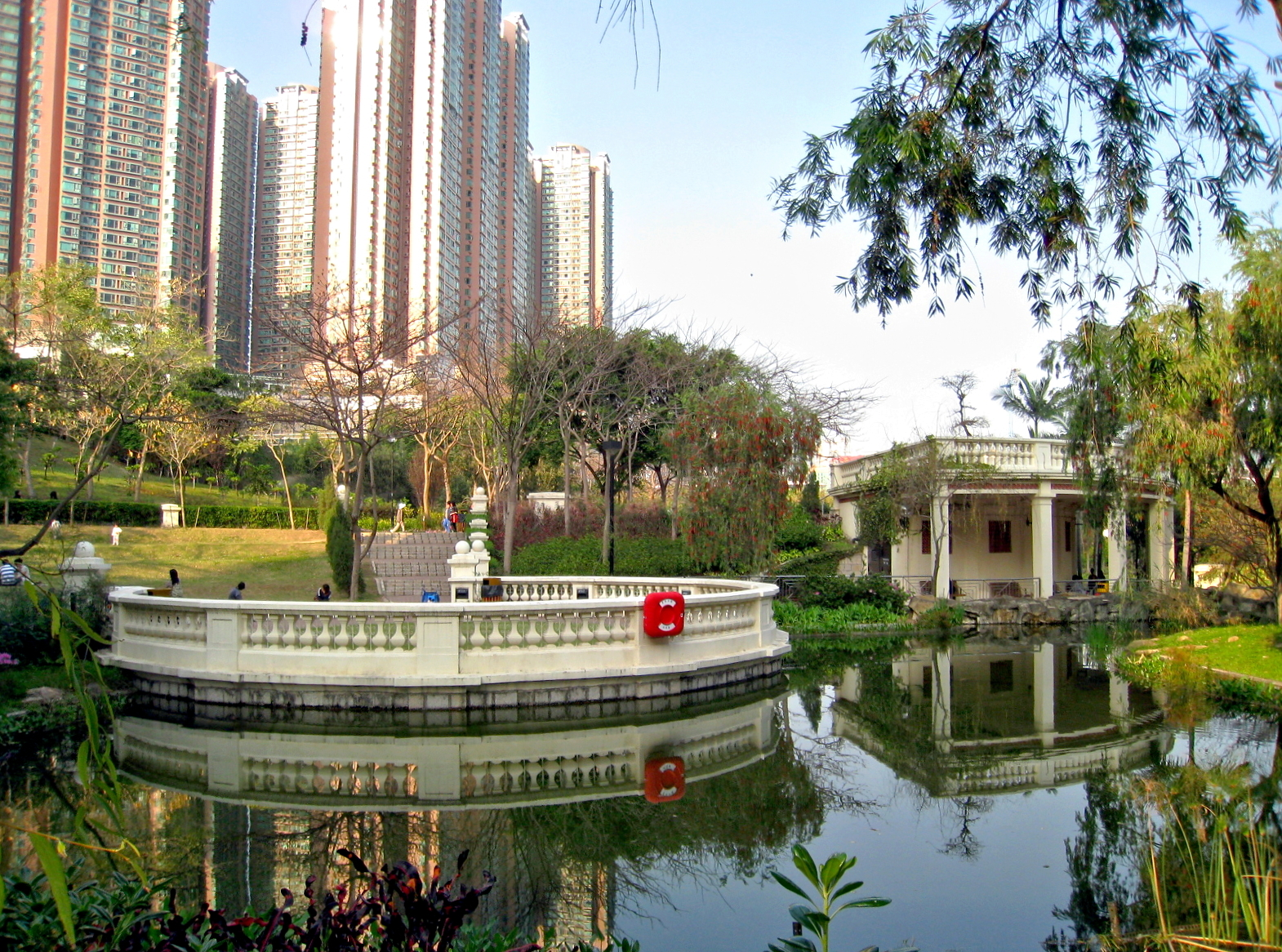
- Tsing Yi Park Ornamental Lake
- Interactive map of Tsing Yi Park
- Type: Public Park
- Location: 60 Tsing King Road, Tsing Yi, New Territories, Hong Kong
- Area: 7.09 hectares (17.5 acres)
- Operator: Leisure and Cultural Service Department
- Open: September 1996; 29 years ago
- Website: www.lcsd.gov.hk/en/parks/typ/index.html

Chinese name
- Traditional Chinese: 青衣公園
- Simplified Chinese: 青衣公园
Transcriptions
Standard Mandarin
- Hanyu Pinyin: Qīngyī Gōngyuán
Yue: Cantonese
- Yale Romanization: Chīng yī gūng yùhn

Tsing Yi Park is a public park on the Tsing Yi Island, Hong Kong with Tsing Yi Estate, Tsing Yi Garden, Broadview Garden and St. Paul's Village in its proximity. It was opened to the public in September 1996, with area of 7.09 hectares, the park was organised by the Leisure and Cultural Service Department. It locates at 60 Tsing King Road and it is under Kwai Tsing District. The park features a pond with many turles and trees and much nature. The park was designed to have a pure European style.

== See also ==
- List of urban public parks and gardens in Hong Kong
