= Tsing Yi Concern Group =

Tsing Yi Concern Group (Chinese: 青衣關注組; TYCG) is a pressure group formed in 1983 by a group of social workers to promote grassroots participation in local affairs in Tsing Yi.

It opposed the Mobil Oil depot storing flammable petroleum products and liquefied petro-gas which would cause chemical pollutions to the residential areas in Tsing Yi, notably the Mayfair Garden which was only fifty metres away from the depot. The leakage of the confidential Hazard Potential Consultancy Report in late 1983 helped the TYCG to mobilise residents for relocation and reduction of hazardous industries in Tsing Yi.

The group also actively participated in the Kwai Chung and Tsing Yi District Board, which led to split of membership between the Tsing Yi Concern Group and the Tsing Yi Action Group which was formed by the defected TYCG members.

In 1989, it became one of the affiliated member of the Hong Kong Alliance in Support of Patriotic Democratic Movements of China in support of the Tiananmen Square protests of 1989. It became increasingly pro-Beijing in 2000s, especially after members of the Group quit their affiliated pro-democracy parties, while some joined Beijing-friendly group Kwai Tsing Community Force.

The final District Councillor affiliated with the TYCG, Simon Chan from Tsing Yi Estate, was defeated in 2019.
