= Public housing estates on Tsing Yi Island =

Public housing on Tsing Yi, Hong Kong

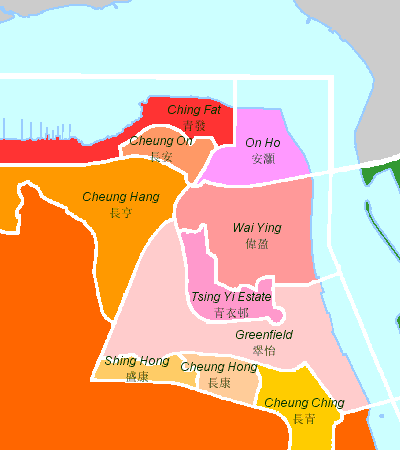
Constituency map, showing approx location of housing on the island

The following is an overview of public housing estates on Tsing Yi, Hong Kong including Home Ownership Scheme (HOS), Private Sector Participation Scheme (PSPS), Flat-for-Sale Scheme (FFSS), Tenant Purchase Scheme (TPS) and Subsidised Sale Flats Project (SSFP) estates.

== History ==
At early 1970s, the residents of Tsing Yi Island were largely villagers and fishermen. Later, the government decided to extend the Tsuen Wan New Town westward onto the island. The plan was to develop the northeastern quadrant of the island into residential use, and some estates were to be built on reclaimed land. The Hong Kong Housing Authority was mandated to construct public housing estates as part of this plan. Cheung Ching Estate is the first stage of new town development.

All the estates in this development are named "Cheung variable Estate" (長x邨), and most flats were destined for rental. Tsing Yi Estate is named after Tsing Yi Hui, which was demolished to make way for its construction.

Easeful Court was originally destined for the HOS, but ended up being let due to the impact of SARS.

== Overview ==
Name		Type	Inaug.	No Blocks	No Units	Notes
Broadview Garden	偉景花園	Flat-for-Sale/Rental	1991	7	1,776	HK Housing Society
Cheung Ching Estate	長青邨	Public	1977	8	4,905	
Cheung Fat Estate	長發邨	TPS	1989	4	2,067	
Cheung Hang Estate	長亨邨	Public	1990	6	4,689	
Cheung Hong Estate	長康邨	Public	1979	13	8,100	
Cheung On Estate	長安邨	TPS	1988	10	7,338	
Cheung Wang Estate No. 1&2	長宏村1 段與2 段		2001	7	4,273	Village
Ching Chun Court	青俊苑	HOS	2017	2	465	
Ching Fu Court	青富苑	GFSHOS	2023	2	2,868	Under construction
Ching Nga Court	青雅苑	HOS	1989	1	816	
Ching Shing Court	青盛苑	HOS	1985	1	800	
Ching Tai Court	青泰苑	HOS	1988	7	2,180	
Ching Wah Court	青華苑	HOS	1986	6	2,460	
Ching Wang Court	青宏苑	HOS	2001	2	576	
Easeful Court	青逸軒	Public	2003	2	510	
Greenview Villa	綠悠雅苑	SSFP	2015	3	988	HK Housing Society
Serene Garden	海悅花園	PSPS	1992	3	840	
Tsing Yi Estate	青衣邨	TPS	1986	4	930	
Tivoli Garden	宏福花園	Sandwich	1995	4	1,024	HK Housing Society

== Broadview Garden ==
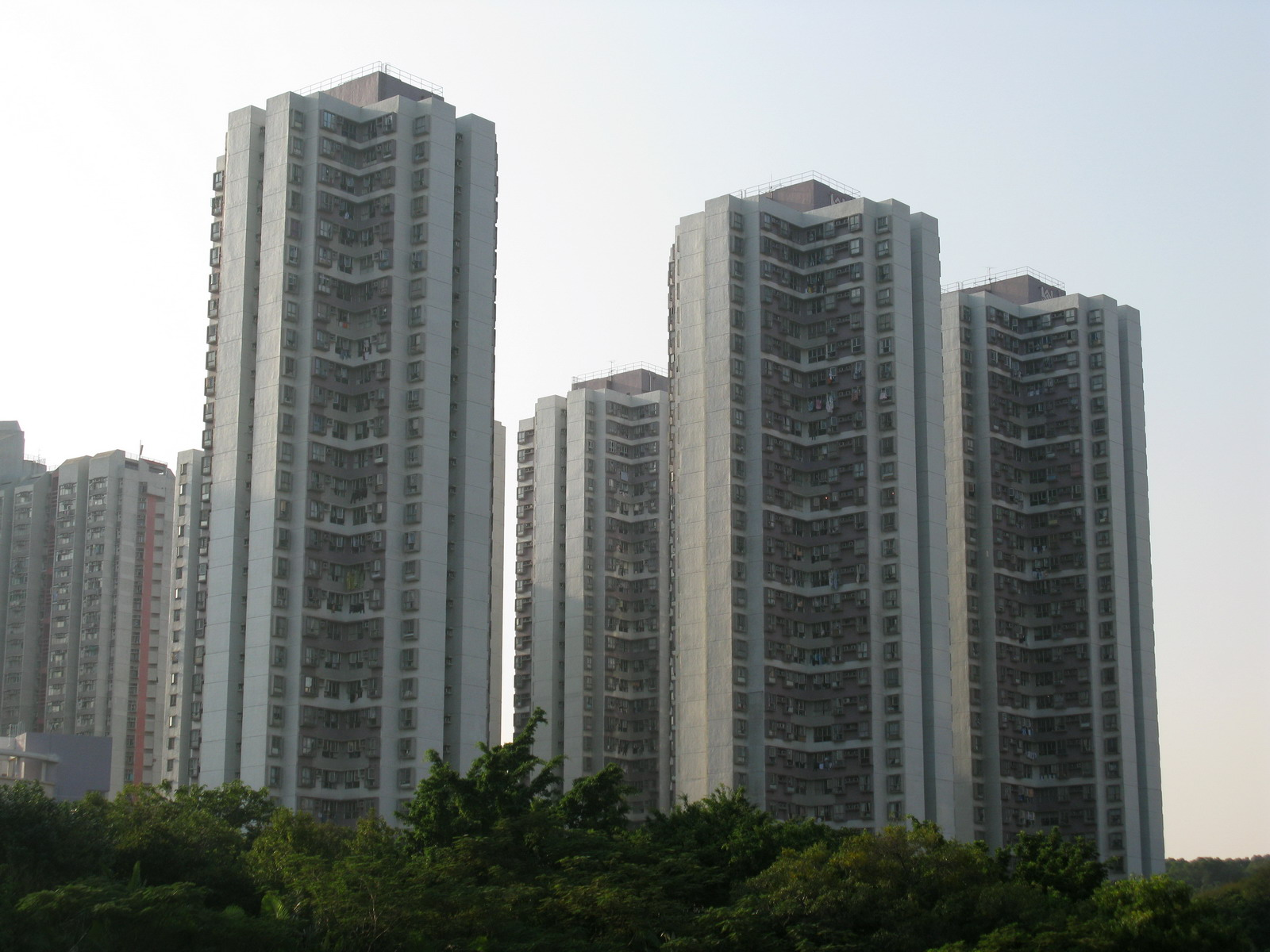
Broadview Garden

Broadview Garden (Chinese: 偉景花園) is a public housing estate built by Hong Kong Housing Society in Tsing Yi, located near Tsing Yi Estate and Tsing Yi Park.

The estate consists of 7 residential blocks completed in 1991. Its Block 1 to 5 is for Flat-for-Sale Scheme and Block 6–7 is for rent, mainly the residents affected by redevelopment of Bo Shek Mansion in Tsuen Wan.

== Cheung Ching Estate ==
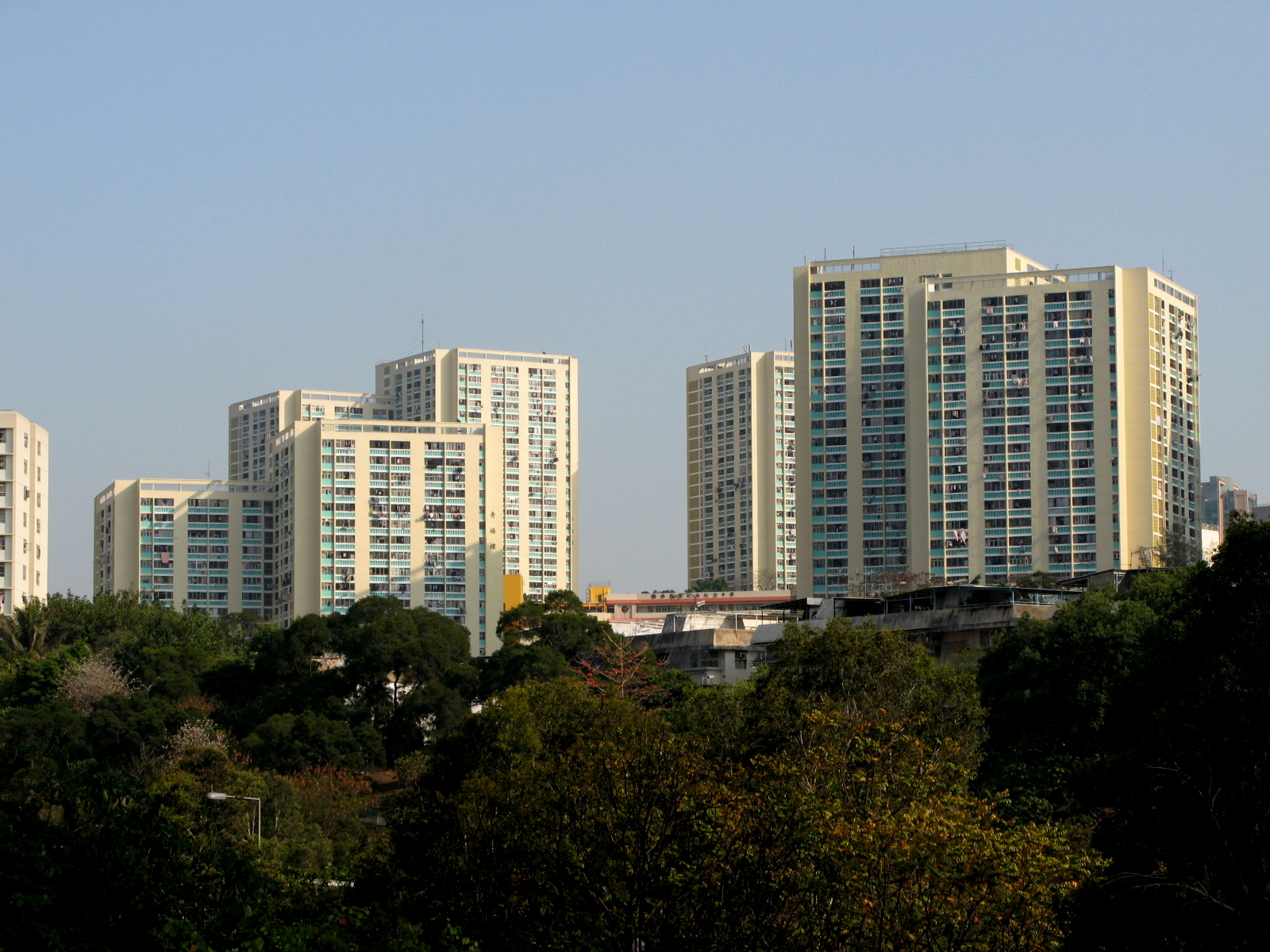
Twin Tower style of Cheung Ching Estate

The Chinese characters Cheung Ching (長青), mean "evergreen". The Estate is located on mid-east side of Tsing Yi Island, near Tsing Yi Bridge. It was bounded by Tsing Yi Road, Ching Hong Road, Chung Mei Road, and Tsing Yi Heung Sze Wui Road.

22°20′42″N 114°06′31″E

In June 1977, the first intake of 2146 people were allocated housing in Phase I of the estate (Ching Wai House, Ching Yung House, and Ching Kwai House). They were residents from overcrowded estates, or were relocated from redevelopment of older (Mk I and Mk II blocks) estates in Kowloon Bay, and Hong Kong Island. At the time, transport infrastructure was undeveloped, and there were great concerns about logistics from would-be residents.

Later, Ching Chung House, Ching Pak House, Ching Mui House and Ching Yeung House came on stream. In the early 1980s, Ching Tao House was built for the relocation of residents owing to reclamation of Tsing Yi Tong and Mun Tsai Tong.

To the west are Mayfair Gardens and Cheung Hong Estate, to the north is Chung Mei Lo Uk Village, to the east are industrial building, to the south are Rambler Crest and the Container Terminal 9.

=== Configuration ===
The estate consists of eight 'houses', i.e. high-rise blocks of flats, with 4905 flats. There are currently 4700 households in the estate. Other than residential blocks, the estate also provides a commercial centre with market, a community centre, a bus terminus, three primary schools, a secondary school, several car parks and garages, and several playgrounds.

The eight houses of the estate are:

House name	Type	Completion
Ching Tao House (青桃樓)	Old Slab	1983
Ching Kwai House (青葵樓)	Old Slab	1977
Ching Wai House (青槐樓)	Twin Tower	1977
Ching Yung House (青榕樓)	Twin Tower	1977
Ching Chung House (青松樓)	Twin Tower	1977
Ching Pak House (青柏樓)	Twin Tower	1977
Ching Mui House (青梅樓)	Twin Tower	1978
Ching Yeung House (青楊樓)	Twin Tower	1979

=== Community facilities ===
The Cheung Ching Commercial Centre (長青邨商場) is a 6-storey complex surrounded by Ching Yung House, Ching Wai House and Ching Kwai House. At the podium level, there are a handful of shops and a Chinese restaurant. At the market level, most shops sell fresh food. A supermarket is at the ground floor. A garage is incorporated in the centre. There are two clinics on the ground floor of Ching Wai House. Some NGOs also set up facilities at Ching Yung House and Ching Kwai House.

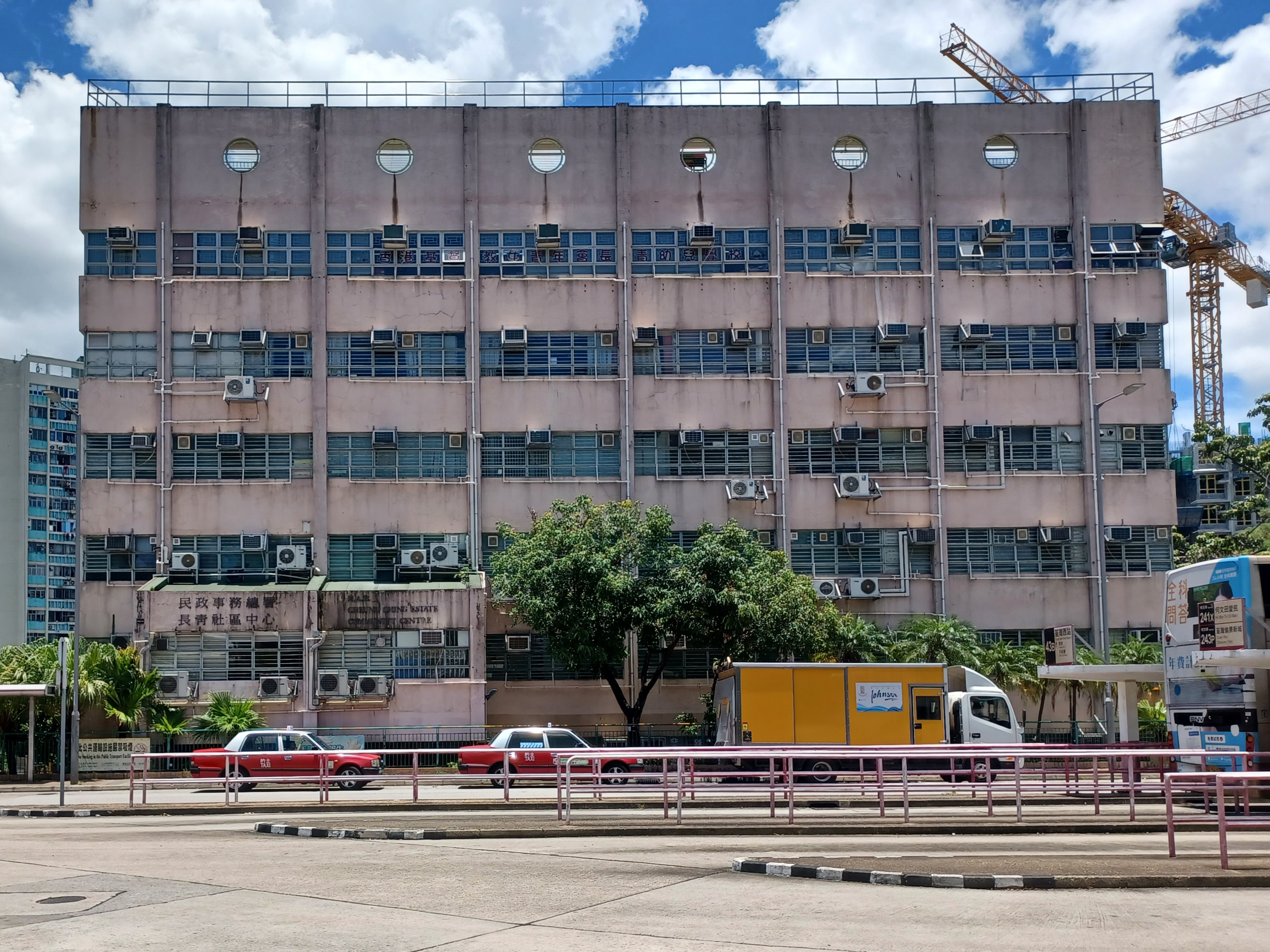
Cheung Ching Estate Community Centre with Cheung Ching Bus Terminus at the front

The Cheung Ching Estate Community Centre (長青社區中心) is the first community centre on the Tsing Yi Island. It was built in the late phase of the Cheung Ching Estate. The building is of 7 storeys, providing various community services for mainly south part of the new town of Tsing Yi Island. The Community Centre is operated by various NGOs. YWCA operates one integrated centre (for youth, family, female and school), one elderly centre, and a kindergarten. Lutheran provides service for the physical handicapped and the deaf. Yan Chai provides temporary after-school care for children. There is a hall for various programmes on the ground floor. From 1st floor to 6th floor, it was occupied by Hong Kong Youth Women's Club Association. Its branch Tsing Yi Integrated Social Service Centre provides integrated services for youth, family, senior citizen, children and workers. Government also has an office on the 1st floor. After budget cuts on social welfare by Hong Kong Government, many local offices of voluntary organisations in the area were withdrawn or incorporated into the centre.

== Cheung Fat Estate ==
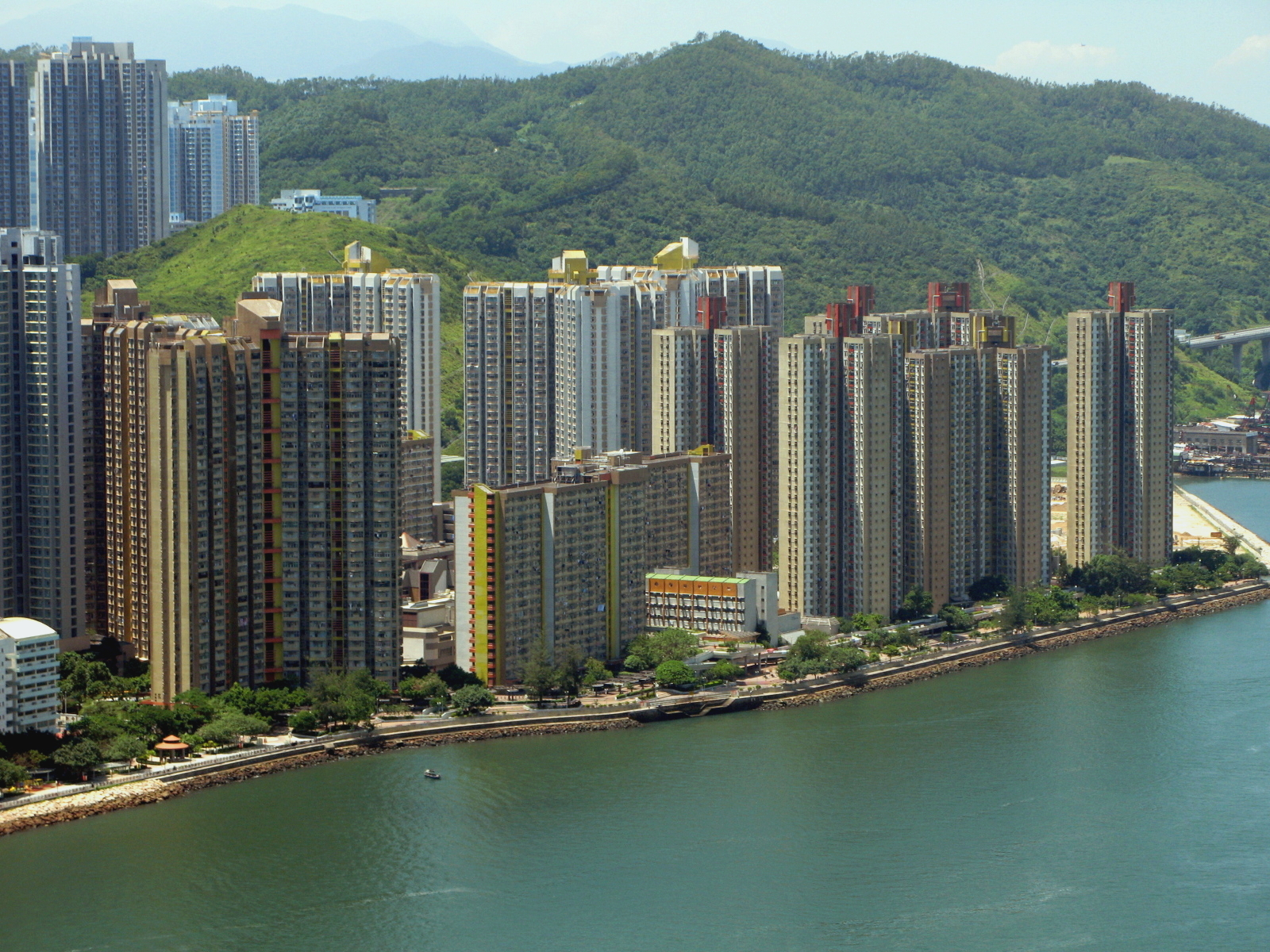
Cheung Fat Estate

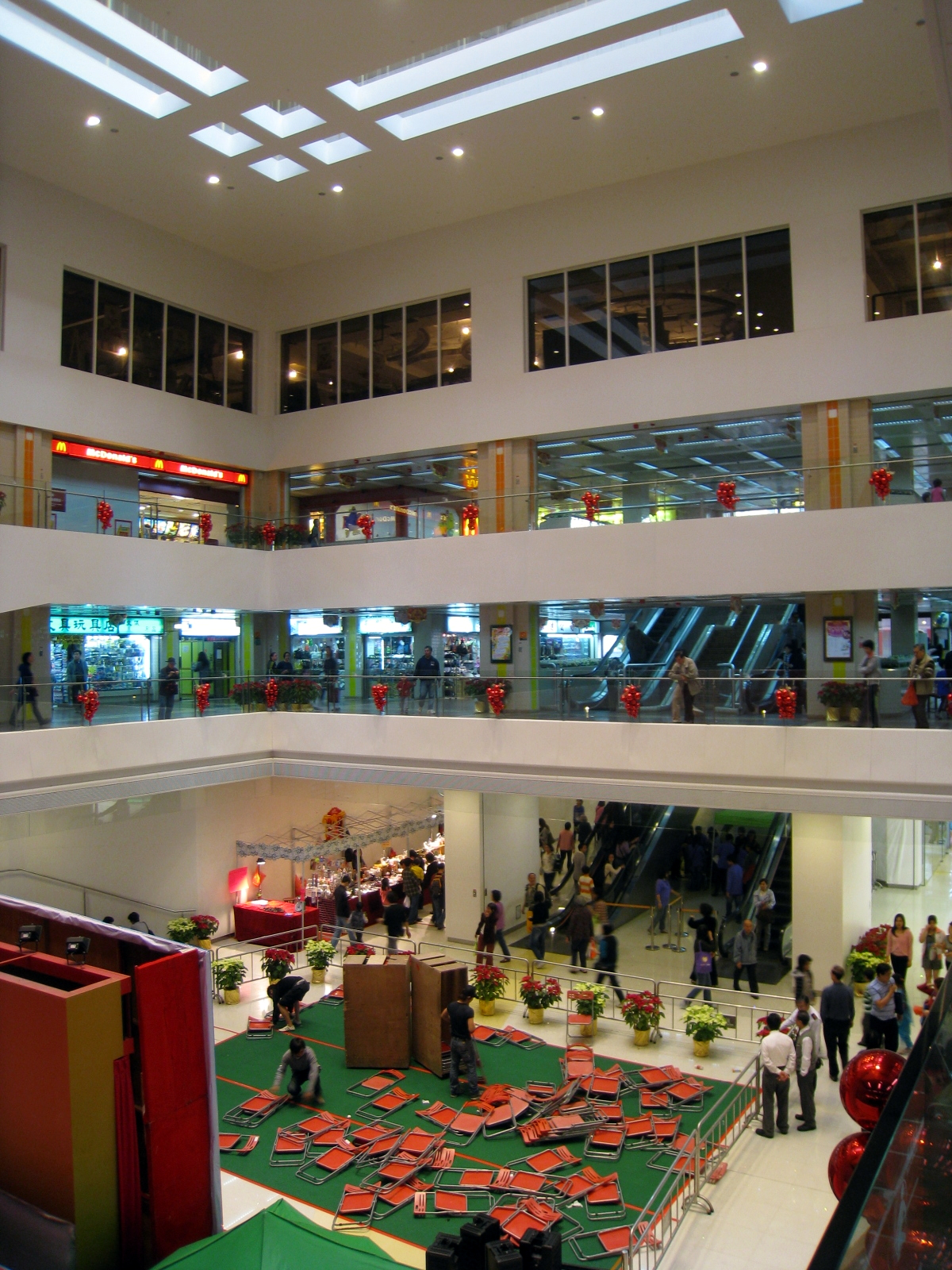
Cheung Fat Plaza

Cheung Fat Estate (Chinese: 長發邨) comprises 4 tower blocks, built on reclaimed land in Tsing Yi North. All buildings, except for King Fat House, enjoy a seaview over Tsuen Wan seashore.

In May 2005, the Government announced the sale of 23,000 hectares (57,000 acres) flats under the final phase of the TPS. Cheung Fat Estate was to be part of this "privatisation" by the Authority, under a scheme in which all "flats" are set for sale by the end of 2006.

House name	Type	Completion
Leung Fat House (亮發樓)	New Slab	1989
Yin Fat House (賢發樓)	New Slab	1989
Chun Fat House (俊發樓)	New Slab	1989
King Fat House (敬發樓)	Trident 3	1989

=== Community facilities ===
Cheung Fat Plaza, a five-storey shopping centre located in the lower part of the estate, caters to the household needs of residents in Cheung Fat and surrounding estates, and was considered one of the most important shopping arcades under the Housing Authority. It is now under the management of Link REIT, having been spun off from the Authority and listed on the Hong Kong stock market in 2005.

There are a variety of facilities, shops and restaurants which cater for the household needs of residents in Cheung Fat and surrounding estates, namely Cheung On Estate and Ching Wang Court. For example, the Sports Centre on the 4th floor which has facilities for badminton, squash and basketball, as well as fitness room. There is a Cantonese restaurant on the top floor, which is famous for its hot pot buffet. McDonald's and other restaurants can be found there as well. There are two supermarkets, one on the ground floor and another on the third floor. Maritime Market is situated next to the shopping centre.

== Cheung Hang Estate ==
Cheung Hang Estate (長亨邨) was built on the hills near Liu To of Tsing Yi Island, Hong Kong. It provides 4689 rental flats and the year of intake was 1990. It is adjacent to Cheung Wang Estate. There is a footpath linking Tsing Yi Nature Trail and Liu To Road near Cheung Hang Shopping Centre. On the trail people can enjoy the beautiful view of Tsing Ma Bridge.

House name	Type	Completion
Hang Lai House (亨麗樓)	Trident 3	1990
Hang Chui House (亨翠樓)	Trident 4	1990
Hang Yip House (亨業樓)	Trident 4	1990
Hang Chi House (亨緻樓)	Trident 4	1990
Hang Chun House (亨俊樓)	Harmony 2	1994
Hang Yee House (亨怡樓)	Harmony 2 with Harmony Annex 3	1995

=== Community facilities ===
Cheung Hang has a small-scale two-floor shopping centre. A Chinese restaurant, Fairwood Restaurant and a cha chaan teng are there. It is next to the bus terminus. Moreover, a Wellcome Supermarket is situated there as well. Under the shopping centre, there is a market. Both the shopping centre and market serve residents of Cheung Hang Estate, Cheung Wang Estate and Mount Haven. A community hall is situated in the middle of the estate.

== Cheung Hong Estate ==
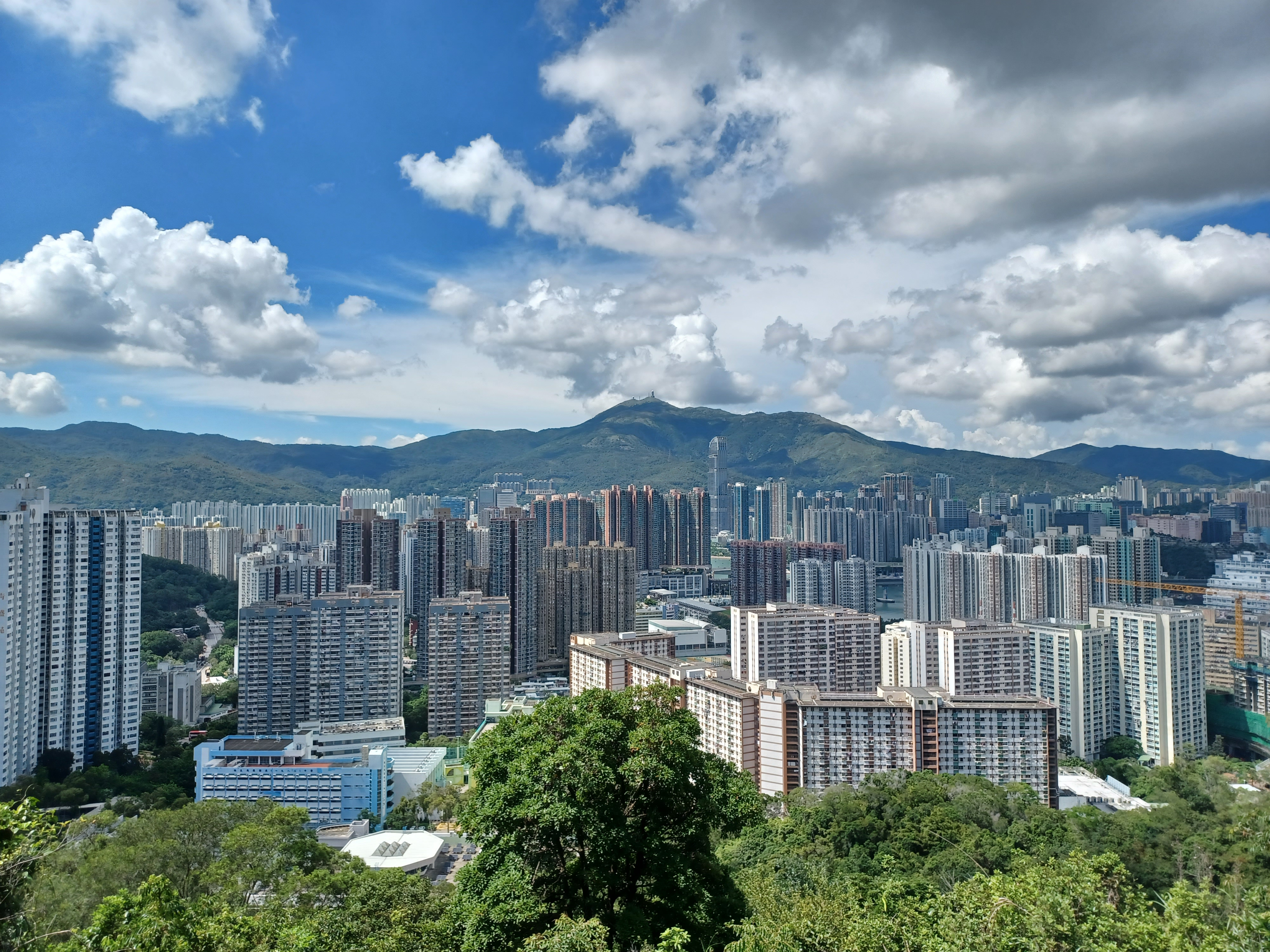
H block and Old slab buildings at Cheung Hong Estate

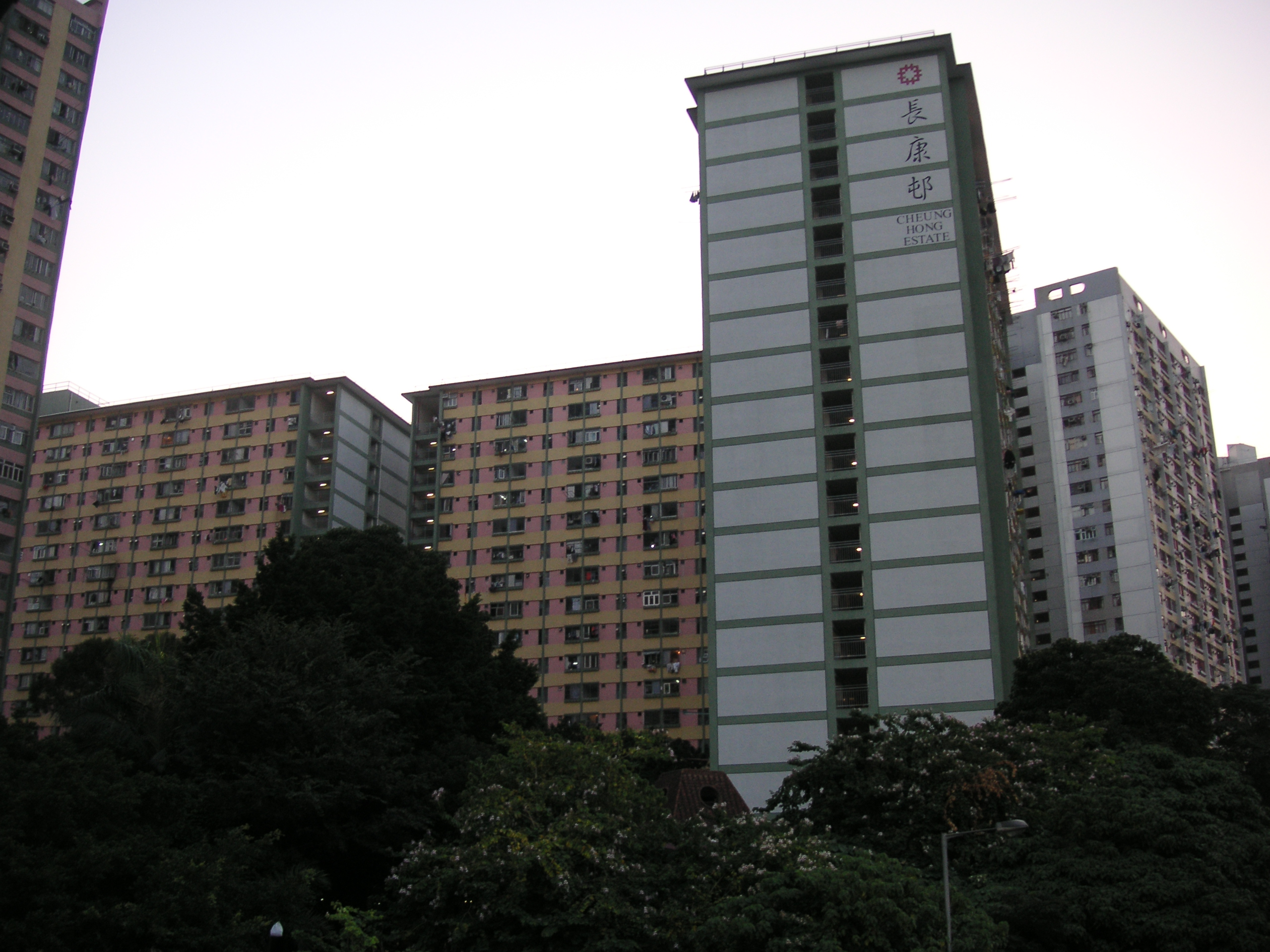
A view of Cheung Hong Estate (Phase II) from Chung Mei Village

Cheung Hong Estate (Chinese: 長康邨) is composed of 13 residential blocks, with two commercial centres. Two primary schools and two secondary schools are also in the estate. This is the second estate in the area.

Cheung Hong is a large estate: it reaches Tsing Yi Road West at the west and nearly Cheung Ching Bus Terminus at the east.

House name	Type	Completion
Hong Wah House (康華樓)	Double H	1979
Hong Fu House (康富樓)	Double H	1979
Hong On House (康安樓)	Double H	1984
Hong Shing House (康盛樓)	Double H	1984
Hong Ping House (康平樓)	Single H	1984
Hong Wing House (康榮樓)	Single H	1980
Hong Kwai House (康貴樓)	Old Slab	1980
Hong Wo House (康和樓)	Old Slab	1980
Hong Tai House (康泰樓)	Old Slab	1982
Hong Cheung House (康祥樓)	Trident 1	1985
Hong Fung House (康豐樓)	Trident 2	1985
Hong Shun House (康順樓)	Trident 1	1986
Hong Mei House (康美樓)	Trident 2	1986

== Cheung On Estate ==
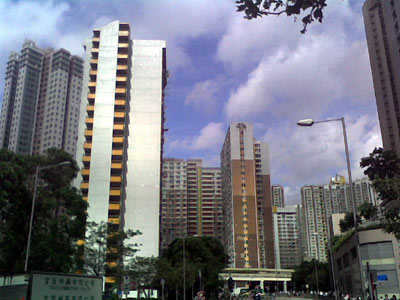
Cheung On Estate

Cheung On Estate (Chinese: 長安邨) is situated in Area 8 of Tsing Yi Island, built on the reclaimed land in Tsing Yi North. The estate consists of ten high-rise blocks of flats. Among 7338 flats in the estate, 5617 flats have been sold to the residents under the TPS since January 1998. Cheung On Estate was one of the first few estates to be sold under the above scheme. The remaining 1721 flats are remained as the public housing, which 1600 households are living in. According to the census taken in 2001, the total population of the estate is 28,278.

The ten blocks in the estate consist of three building types: Linear 1, New Slab and Trident 3. They are:

House name	Type	Completion
On Chiu House (安潮樓)	Trident 3	1989
On Pak House (安泊樓)	Trident 3	1989
On Hoi House (安海樓)	Trident 3	1988
On Yeung House (安洋樓)	Trident 3	1988
On Mei House (安湄樓)	Trident 3	1988
On Yun House (安潤樓)	Linear 1	1988
On Ching House (安清樓)	Linear 1	1988
On Wu House (安湖樓)	New Slab	1988
On Tao House (安濤樓)	New Slab	1987
On Kong House (安江樓)	Trident 3	1987

== Cheung Wang Estate ==
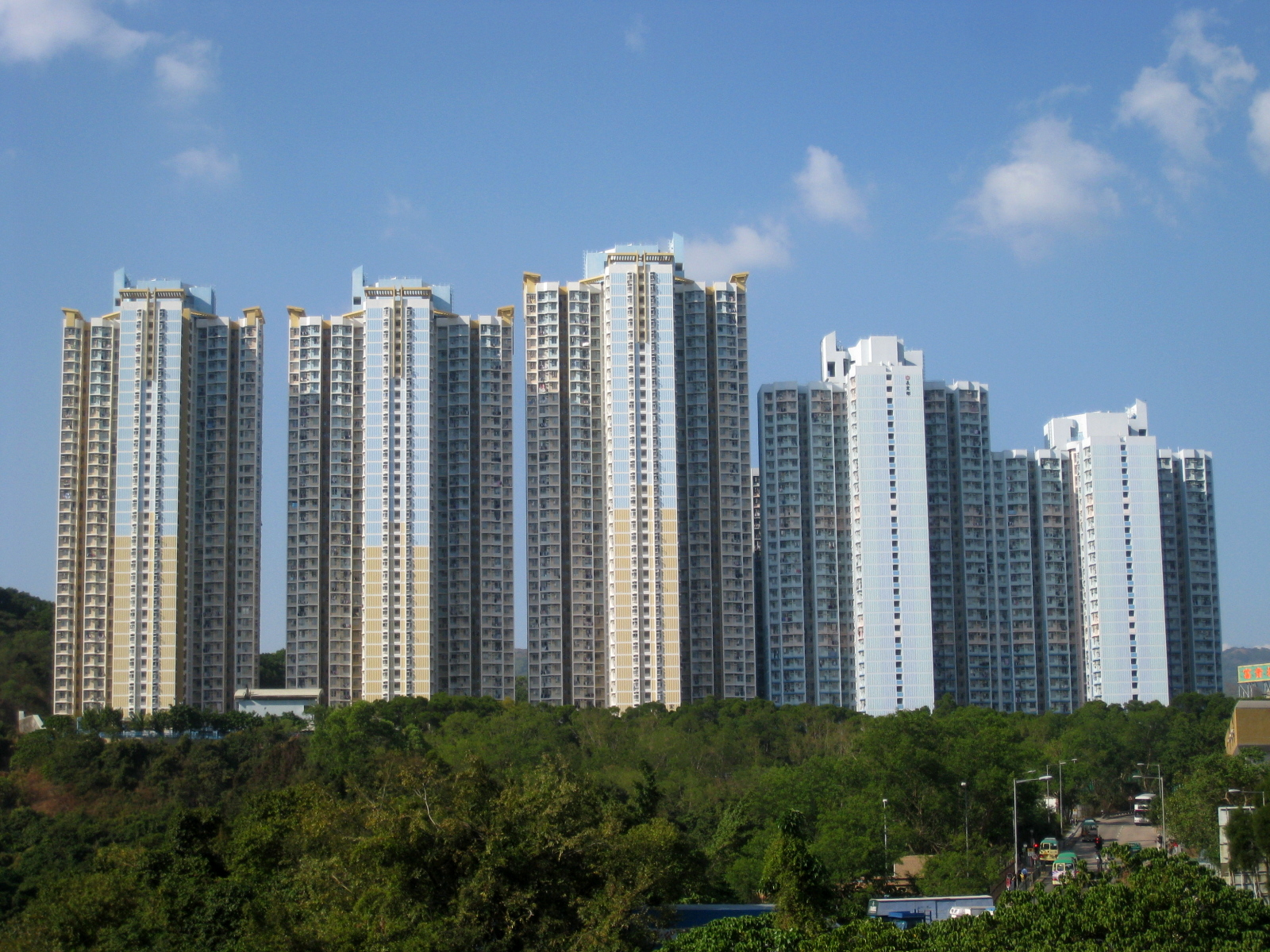
Cheung Wang Estate

Cheung Wang Estate (長宏邨) is situated in Liu To on Tsing Yi Island, Hong Kong. It was built on the hilly site of Tsing Yan Temporary Housing Area (青欣臨時房屋區) after the temporary houses were demolished. The estate consists of seven high-rise blocks of flats, with 4273 flats.

House name	Type	Completion
Wang Man House (宏文樓)	Harmony 1	2001
Wang Ching House (宏正樓)	Harmony 1	2001
Wang Ngai House (宏毅樓)	Harmony 1	2001
Wang Yung House (宏勇樓)	New Harmony 1	2003
Wang Sum House (宏心樓)	New Harmony 1	2003
Wang Yee House (宏意樓)	New Harmony 1	2003
Wang Sin House (宏善樓)	New Harmony 1	2003

== Ching Chun Court ==
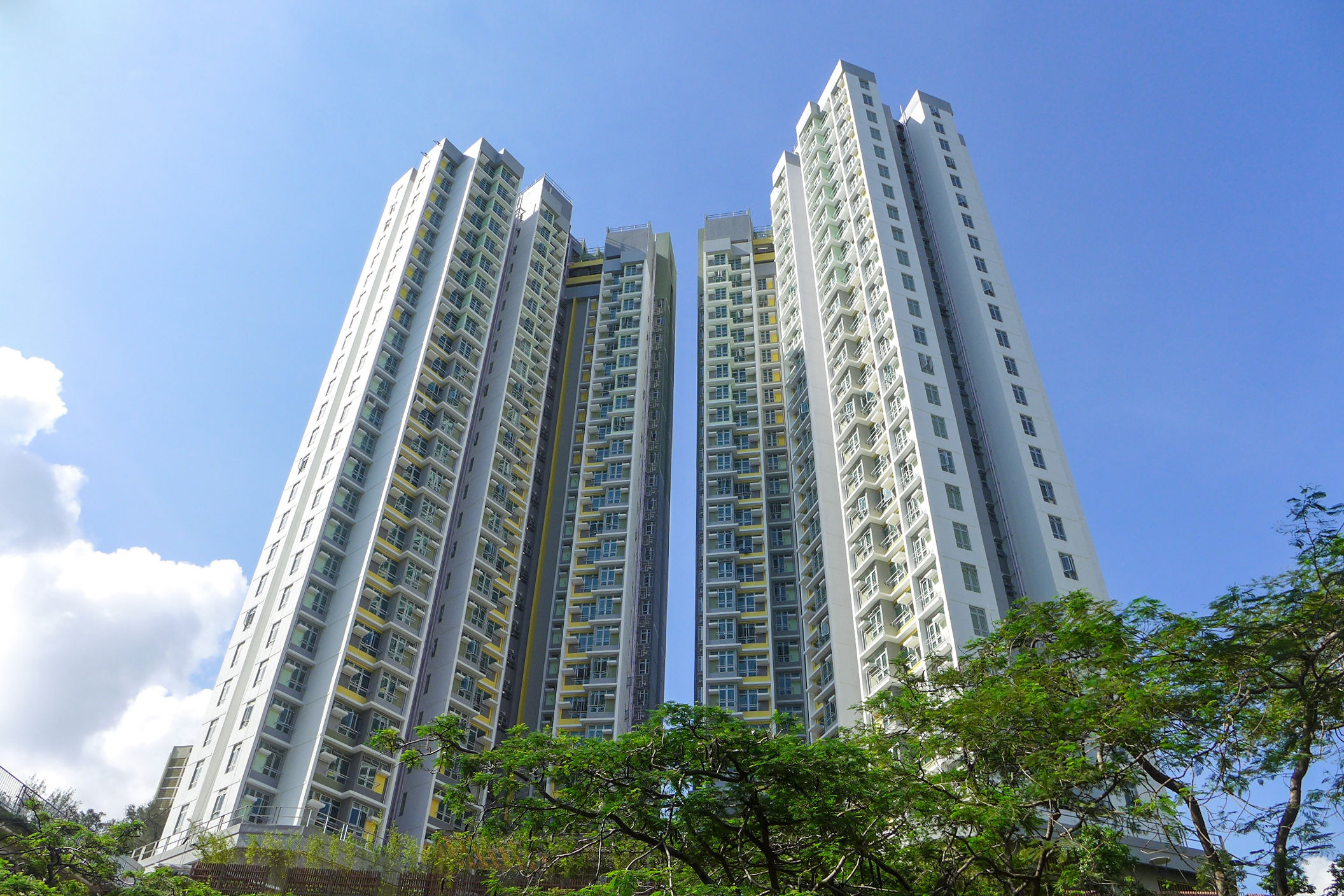
Ching Chun Court

Ching Chun Court (Chinese: 青俊苑) is a HOS court in Ching Hong Road, Tsing Yi South, near Cheung Ching Estate and Cheung Hong Estate. It comprises two 26-storey blocks with total of 465 flats. The flat size ranges from 420 to 440 square feet sold at an amount from HK$2.2M to HK$2.7M. It was completed in 2017.

House name	Type	Completion
Chun Hin House (俊軒閣)	Non-standard blocks	2017
Chun Ho House (俊豪閣)	Non-standard blocks	2017

Chun Ho House was sealed for covid-test on 28 February 2022.

== Ching Fu Court ==
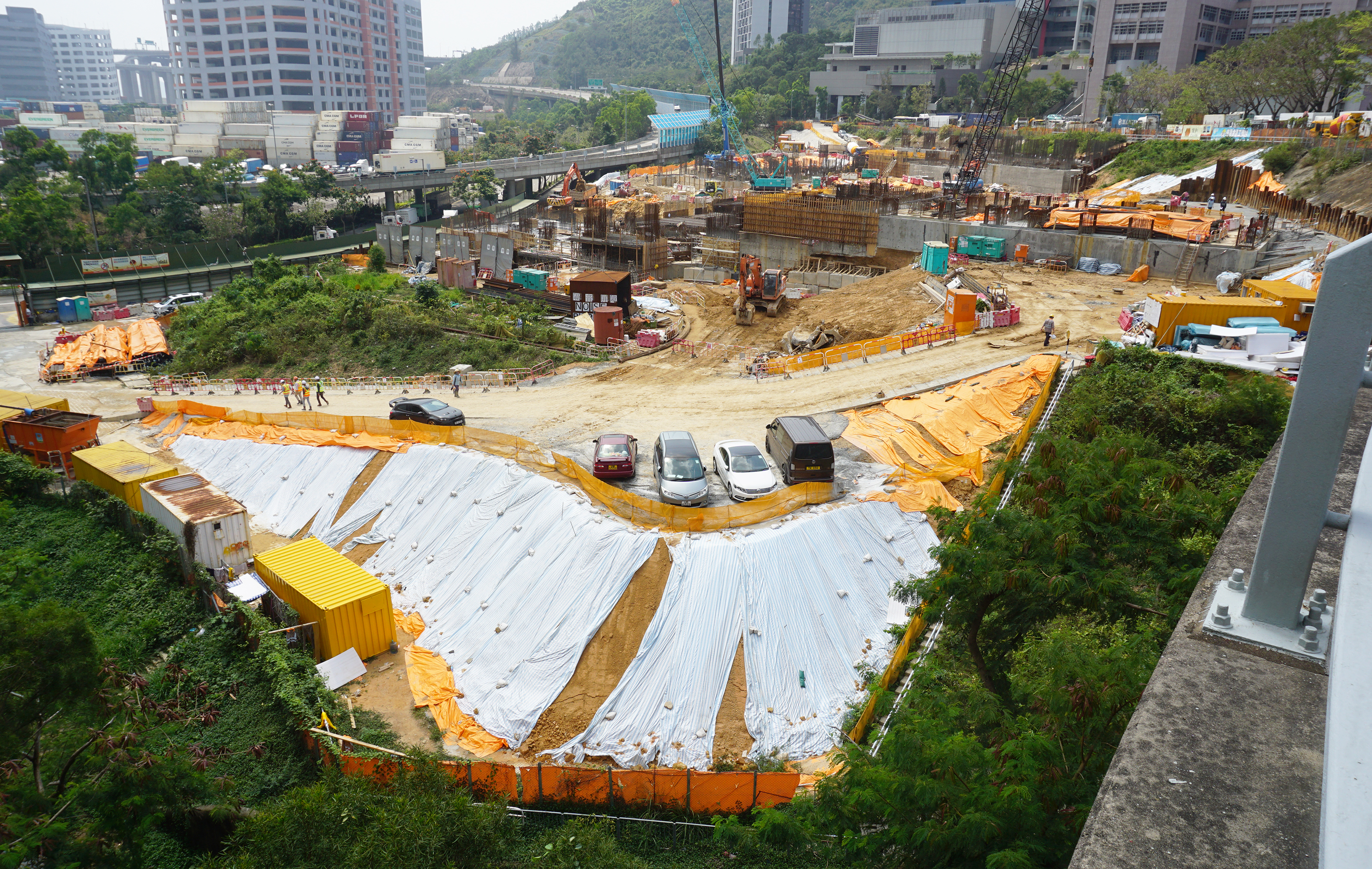
Ching Fu Court under construction

Ching Fu Court (Chinese: 青富苑) is a HOS court under Green Form Subsidised Home Ownership Scheme in Tsing Yi South between Rambler Crest and Mayfair Garden. Flat size ranges from 187 to 471 square foot and will be sold at less than 50 percent of market price from HK$820,000 to HK$2.73 million.

House name	Type	Completion
Ching Ying House (青盈閣)	Non-standard	2023
Ching Lung House (青隆閣)	Non-standard	2023

== Ching Nga Court ==
Ching Nga Court (Chinese: 青雅苑) is a HOS court in Tsing Yi North, located at the east of Cheung Fat Estate. It has only one block built in 1989.

House name	Type	Completion
Ching Nga Court (青雅苑)	Trident 3	1989

== Ching Shing Court ==
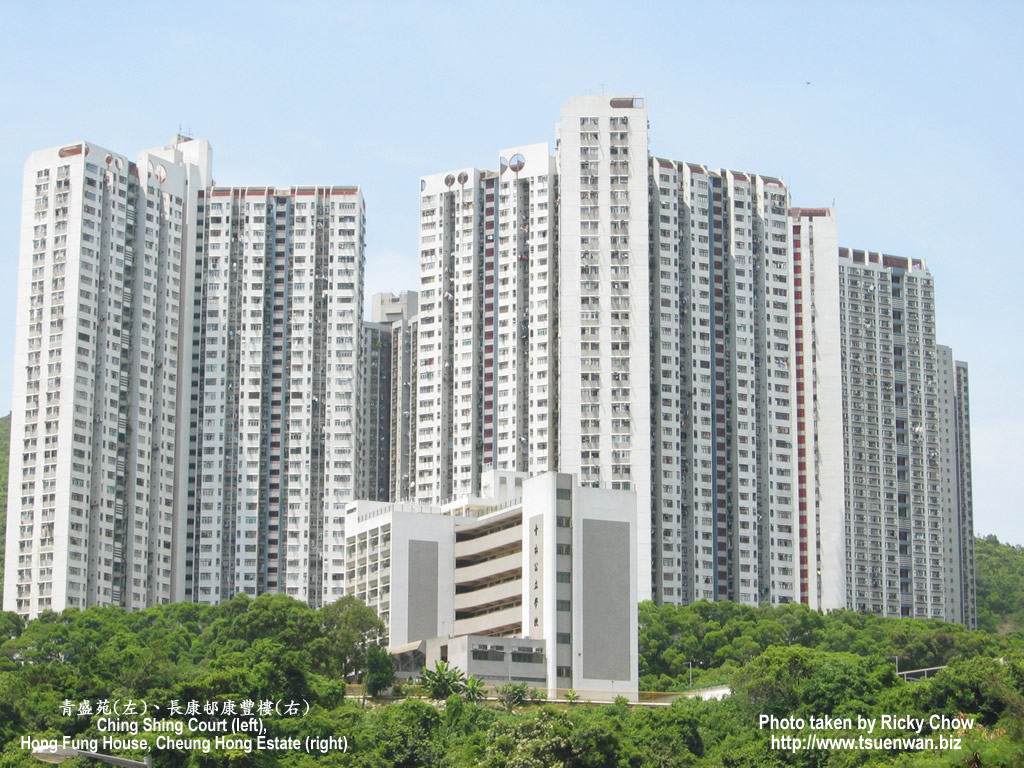
Ching Shing Court (left)

Ching Shing Court (Chinese: 青盛苑) is the first HOS court in Tsing Yi, near Hong Fung House, Cheung Hong Estate. It is a block designated for HOS during the development of public housing estate Cheung Hong Estate. It looks like the integral part of the estate. It has only block built in 1985.

House name	Type	Completion
Ching Shing Court (青盛苑)	Trident 2	1985

== Ching Tai Court ==
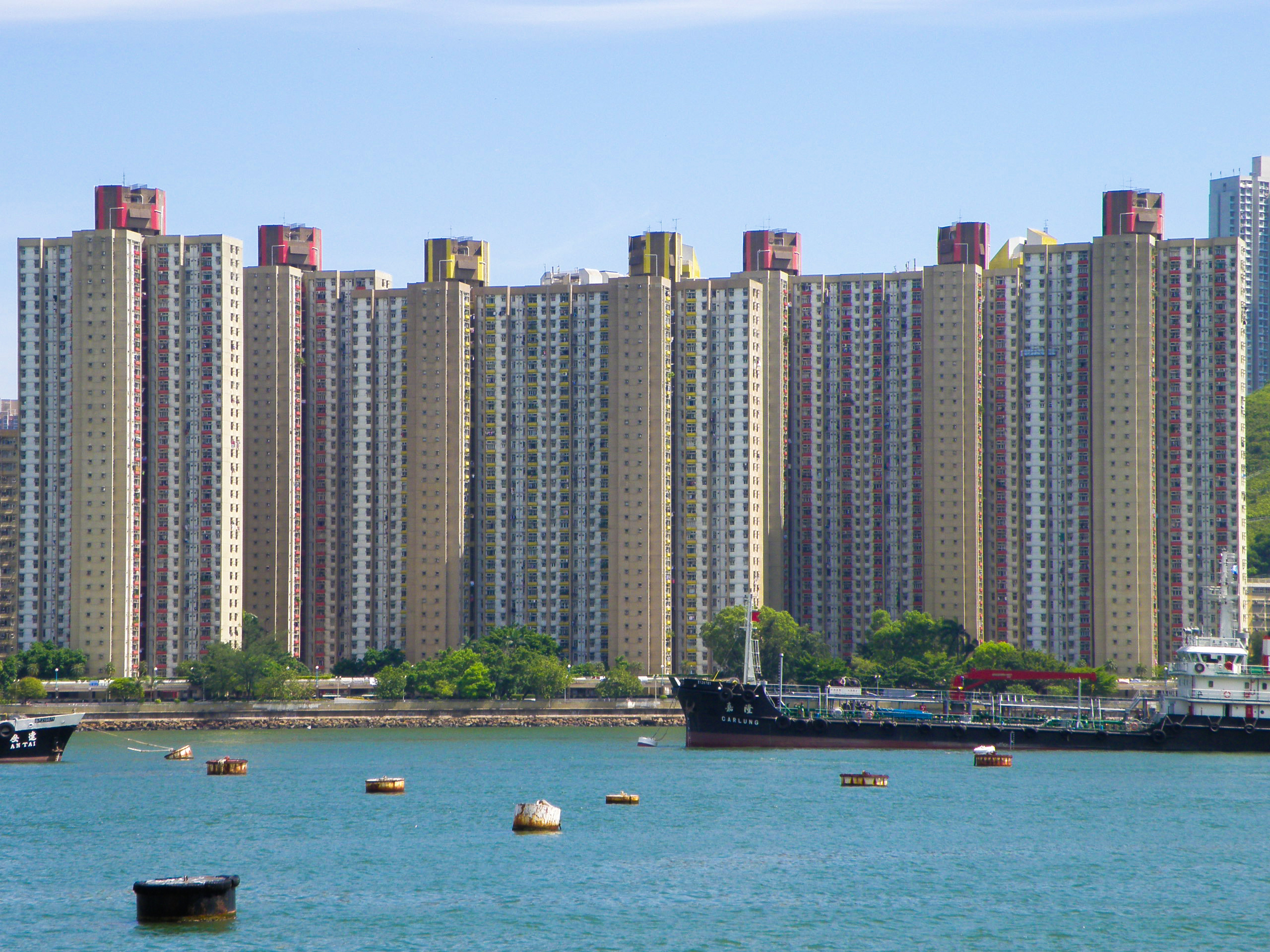
Ching Tai Court

Ching Tai Court (Chinese: 青泰苑) is a HOS court in Tsing Yi North, located at the west of Cheung Fat Estate. It has 7 blocks built in 1988.

House name	Type	Completion
Cheung Tai House (祥泰閣)	NCB(v:1984)	1988
Po Tai House (保泰閣)	NCB(v:1984)	1988
Hang Tai House (恆泰閣)	NCB(v:1984)	1988
Tung Tai House (通泰閣)	NCB(v:1984)	1988
Shing Tai House (誠泰閣)	NCB(v:1984)	1988
Chun Tai House (俊泰閣)	NCB(v:1984)	1988
Hung Tai House (鴻泰閣)	NCB(v:1984)	1988

== Ching Wah Court ==
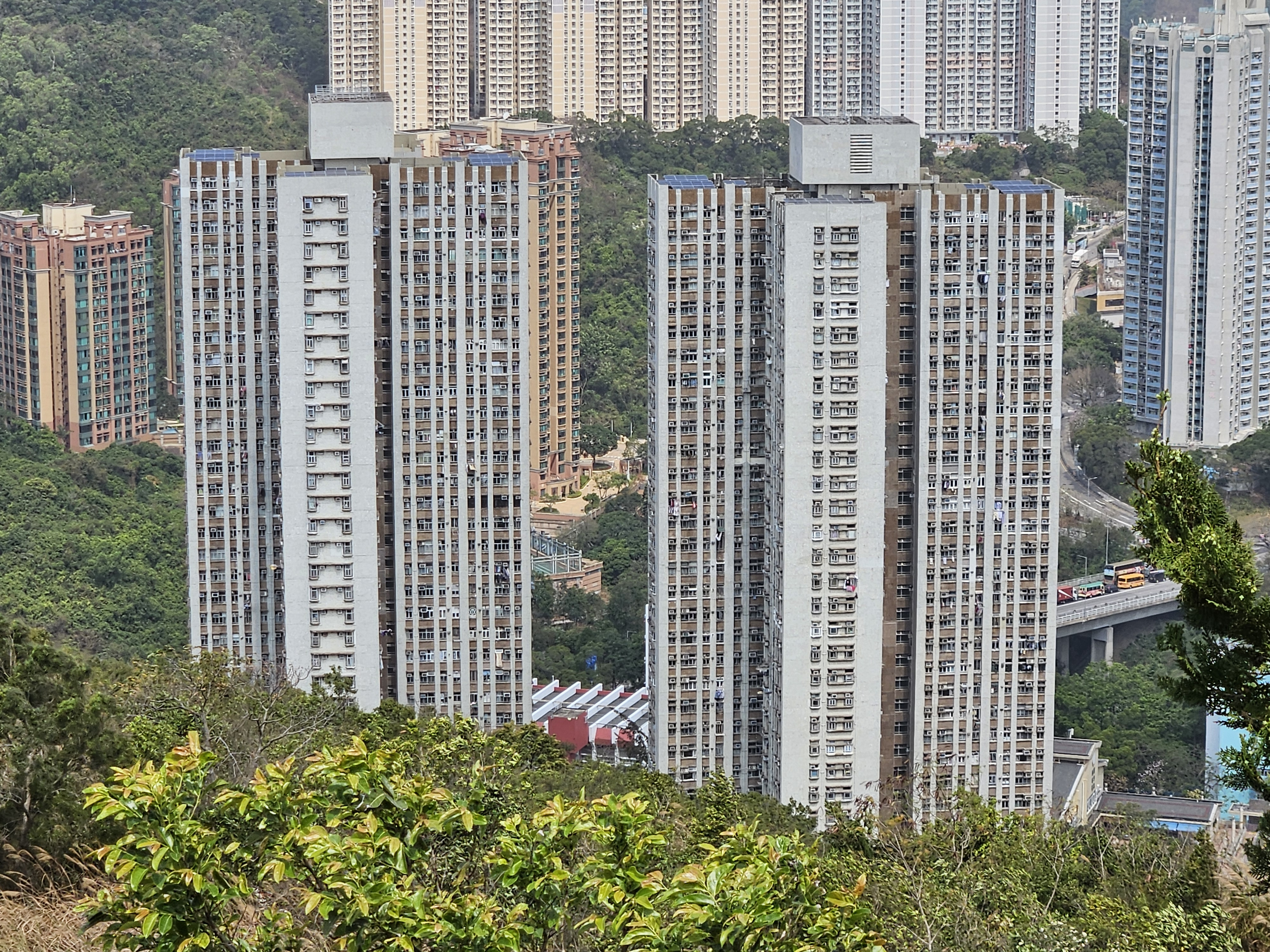
Wah Woon House and Wah Suen House, Ching Wah Court

Ching Wah Court (Chinese: 青華苑) is a HOS court in Tsing Yi, situated on the hills opposite to Cheung Hong Estate Phase 2. It has totally 6 blocks built in 1986. It is unlike the first Home Ownership Scheme estate, Ching Shing Court, which was the first one completely designed to be a standalone comparable to other private housing estates on the island.

House name	Type	Completion
Wah Woon House (華奐閣)	Windmill	1986
Wah Suen House (華璇閣)	Windmill	1986
Wah Pik House (華碧閣)	NCB (Ver.1984)	1986
Wah Fung House (華豐閣)	NCB (Ver.1984)	1986
Wah Yan House (華欣閣)	NCB (Ver.1984)	1986
Wan Cheung House (華翔閣)	NCB (Ver.1984)	1986

== Ching Wang Court ==
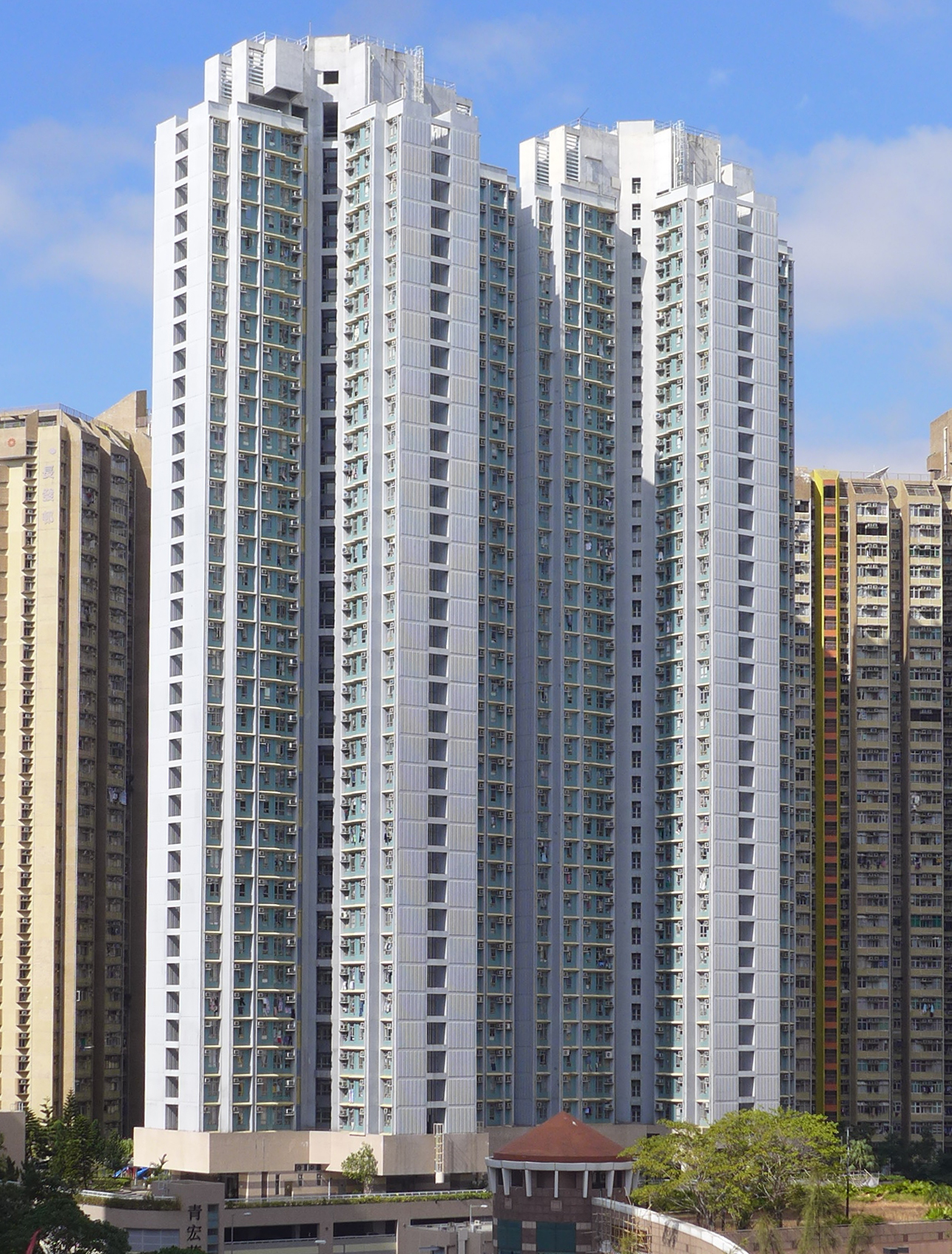
Ching Wang Court

Ching Wang Court (Chinese: 青宏苑) is a HOS in Tsing Yi, near Cheung On Estate, Cheung Fat Estate and Villa Esplanada. Formerly the site of Ching Fat Temporary Housing Area, it consists of 2 residential buildings completed in 2001.

House name	Type	Completion
Wang Chau House (宏就閣)	Concord 1	2001
Wang Yu House (宏裕閣)	Concord 1	2001

== Easeful Court ==
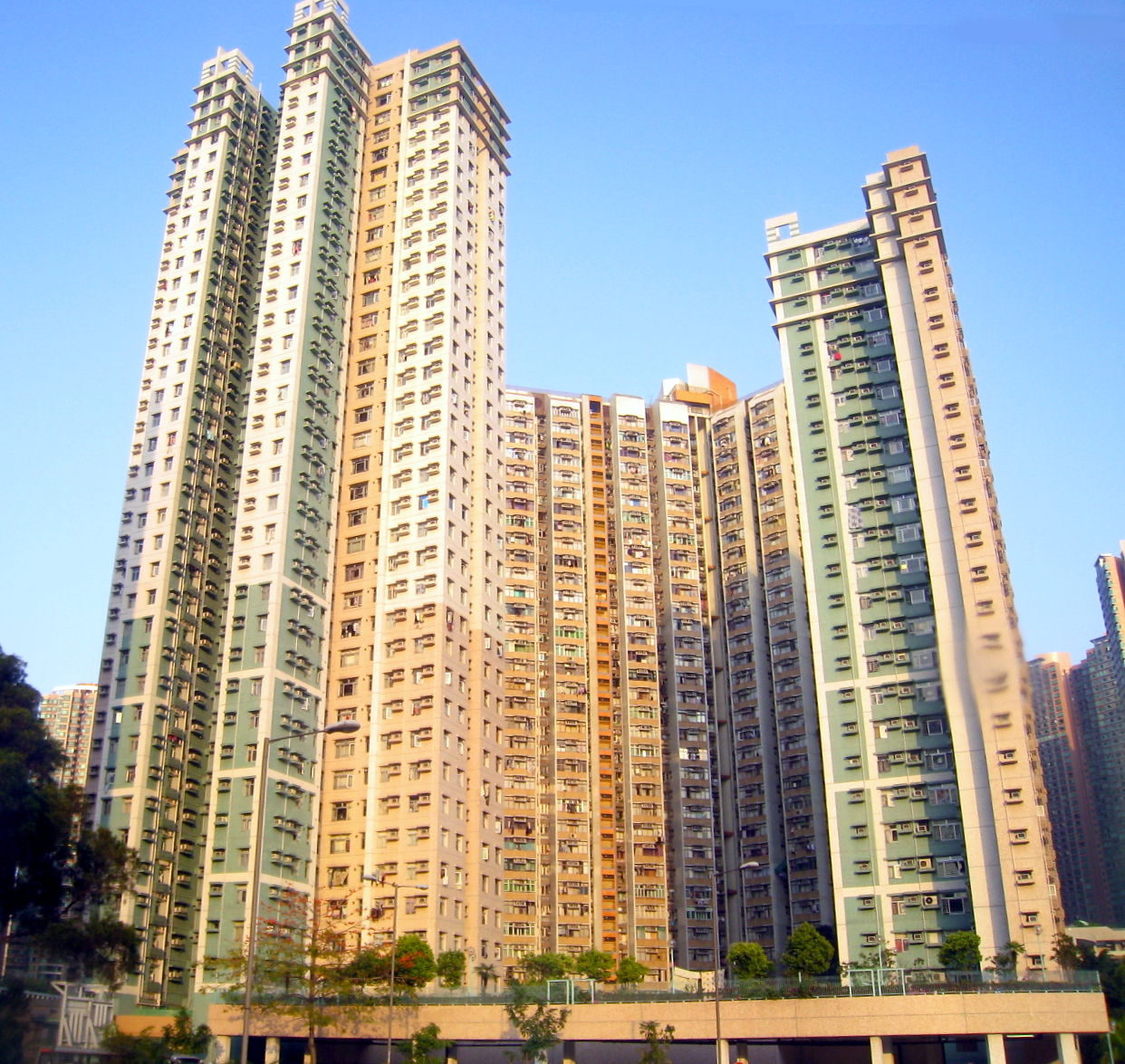
Easeful Court

Easeful Court (Chinese: 青逸軒) is a public housing estate in Tsing Yi Island, New Territories, Hong Kong. It is located near Delia (Man Kiu) English Primary School, Tsing Yi North Coastal Road and Cheung On Estate and within walking distance to MTR Tsing Yi station. It consists of two residential blocks completed in 2003, with a total of 510 rental units. It was supposed to be sold under HOS, but was changed to rental after policy change of Hong Kong Government at the time of a property slump to stabilise the property prices in wake of the SARS epidemic.

Easeful Court is located in On Ho constituency of the Kwai Tsing District Council. It was formerly represented by Warren Tam Ka-chun, who was elected in the 2019 elections until July 2021.

House name	Chinese name	Building type	Completed
Tower 1	第1座	Non-standard	2003
Tower 2	第2座	Non-standard	2003

== Greenview Villa ==
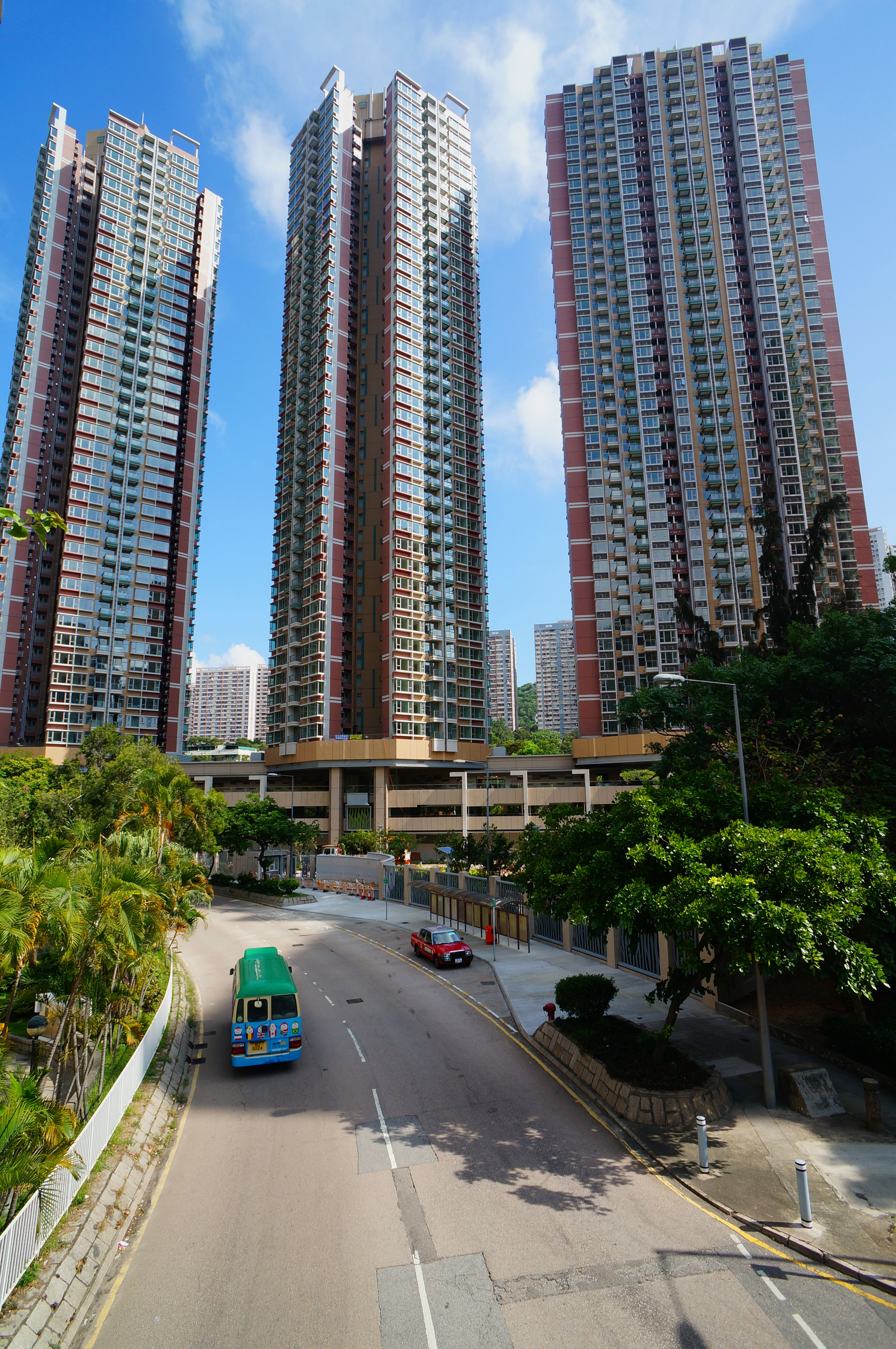
Greenview Villa

Greenview Villa (Chinese: 綠悠雅苑) is the first Subsidized Sale Flats Project court developed by the Hong Kong Housing Society in Tsing Luk Street, Tsing Yi. It consists of three 38-storey residential towers providing 988 residential units on a 2-storey podium with landscape garden, car park and recreational facilities, with an extensive on-grade landscape garden. The flats were sold in 2012 to individuals with a monthly income of HK$25,000 or less, and to households with a monthly income of HK$40,000 or less and they were priced from HK$5,841 to HK$7,402 per sq ft in terms of saleable area - a 30 per cent market discount. It completed in 2015.

House name	Type	Completion
Block 1	Designed by architect	2015
Block 2	Designed by architect	2015
Block 3	Designed by architect	2015

== Serene Garden ==
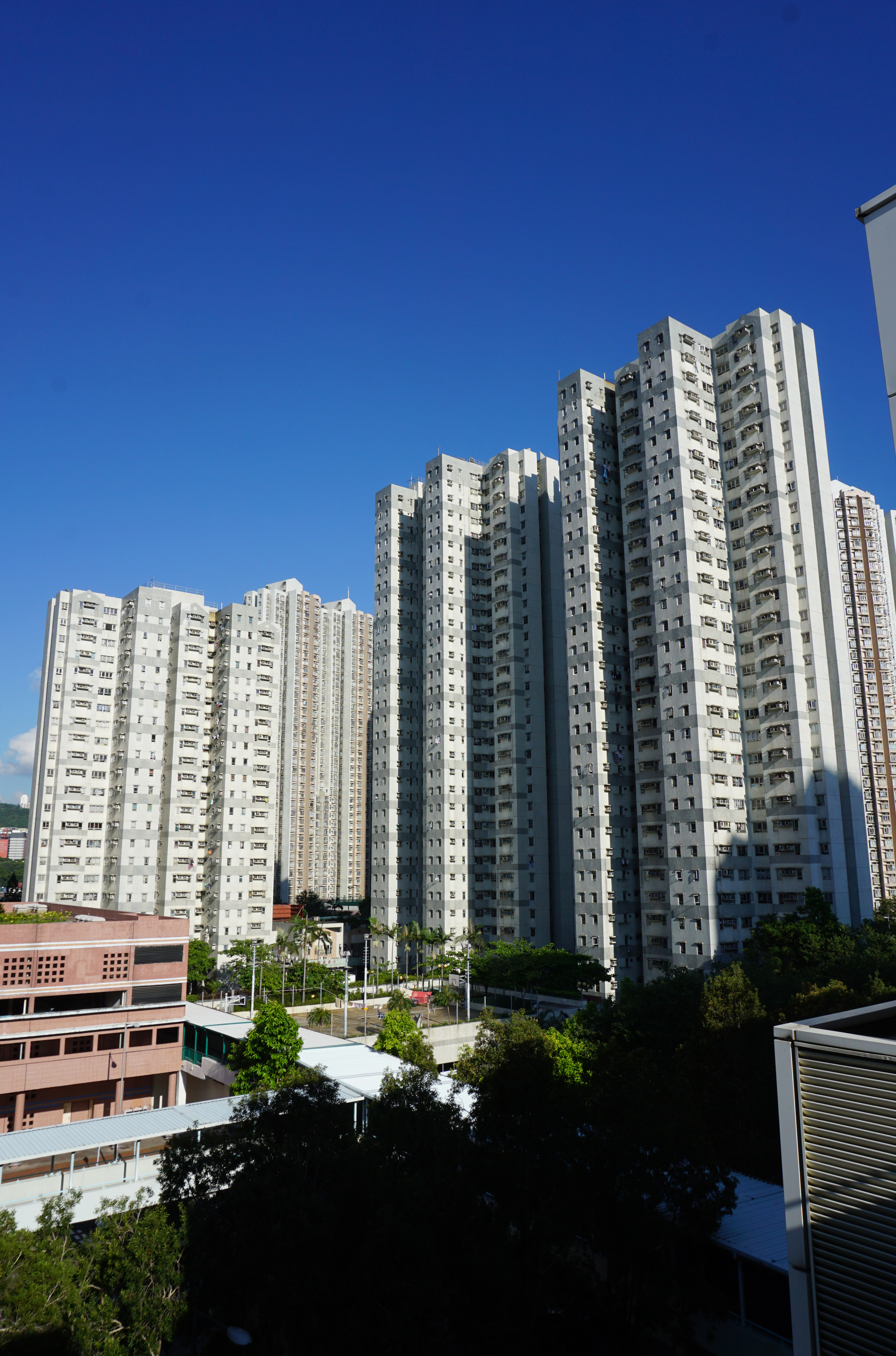
Serene Garden

Serene Garden (Chinese: 海悅花園) is a HOS and PSPS court in Tsing Yi, located at the reclaimed land of Tsing Yi Bay. It is near Tsing Yi Park, Tsing Yi Pier, Greenfield Garden and Tivoli Garden. It has three blocks built in 1992.

House name	Type	Completion
Block 1	Private Sector Participation Scheme	1992
Block 2	Private Sector Participation Scheme	1992
Block 3	Private Sector Participation Scheme	1992

== Tivoli Garden ==
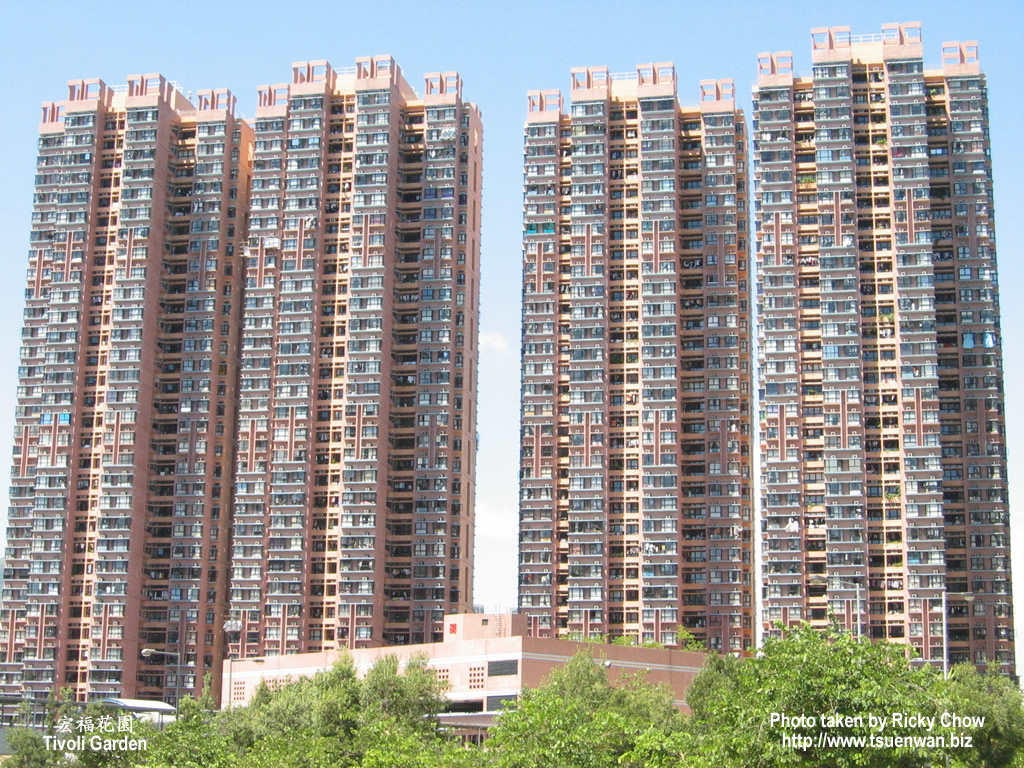
Tivoli Garden

Tivoli Garden (Chinese: 宏福花園) is a housing estate in Tsing Yi, New Territories, developed by the Hong Kong Housing Society in 1995. It was the Society's first development under the Sandwich Class Housing Scheme.

It is located at 75 Tsing King Road, between Serene Garden and Tsing Yi Sports Ground. It takes its name from the town of Tivoli in the Lazio region of central Italy.

Tivoli Garden comprises four blocks and a total of 1,024 apartments, with sizes ranging from 635 to 832 sq. ft.

The project was completed with three months delay, and a contractor was fined as a consequence. After completion, about 1,900 complaints related to the buildings quality were directed by tenants to the Hong Kong Housing Society in July 1996. The society later announced that it had apologised to the residents and that most defects had been repaired.

== Tsing Yi Estate ==
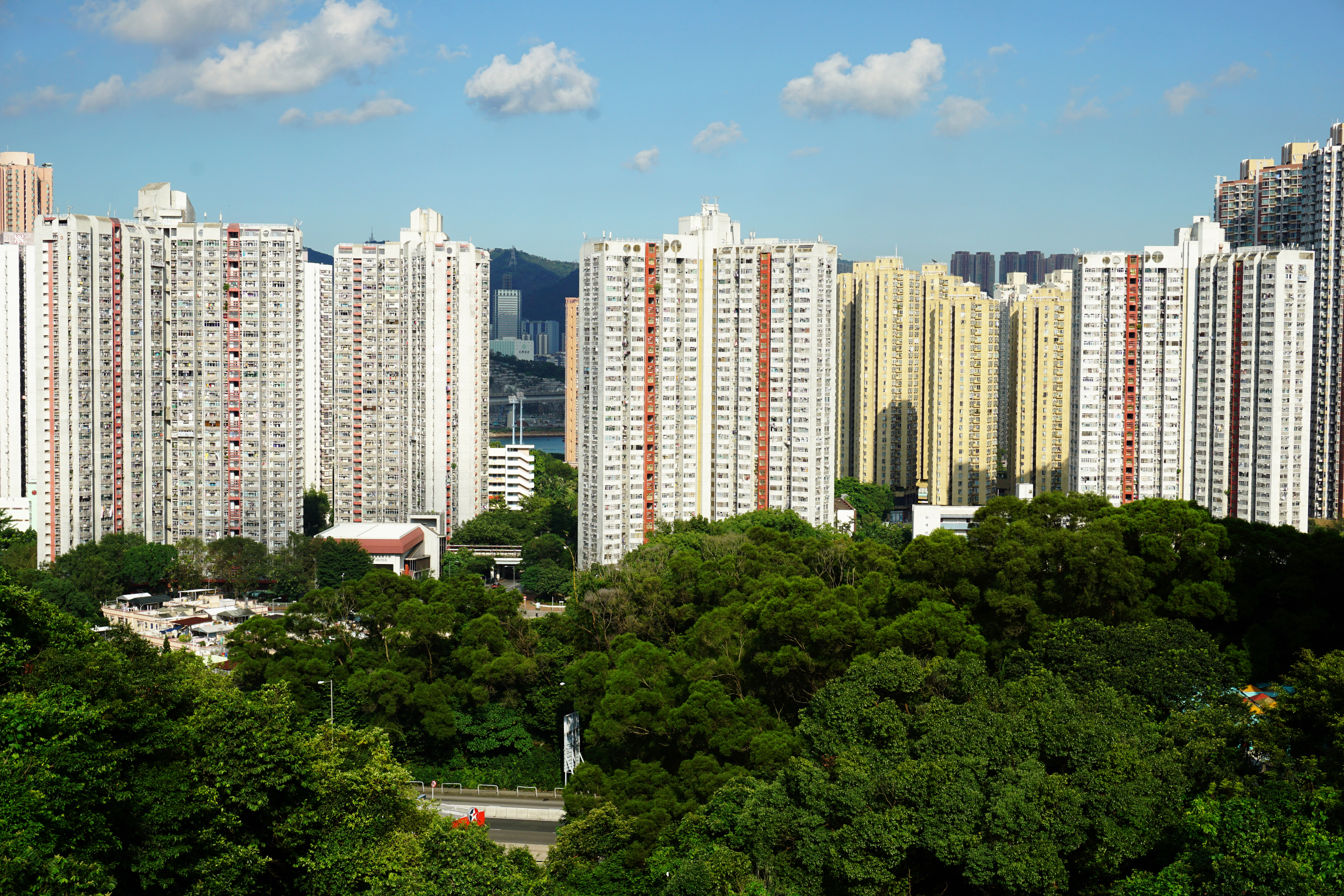
Tsing Yi Estate

Tsing Yi Estate (Chinese: 青衣邨) is the only public housing estate on Tsing Yi Island which name does not start with the character Cheung (長). This is due to the fact that the estate was named in the memory of Tsing Yi Town (青衣墟), a traditional market town which was demolished in the 1980s to make way for new town developments. Since the estate was situated at the seaside of old Tsing Yi Town, part of it is built on reclaimed land. The estate consists of four high-rise blocks of flats.

The four residential blocks are:

House name	Type	Completion
Yee Kui House (宜居樓)	Trident 2	1986
Yee Yip House (宜業樓)	Trident 2	1986
Yee Wai House (宜偉樓)	Trident 3	1989
Yee Yat House (宜逸樓)	Trident 4	1989

== Gallery ==
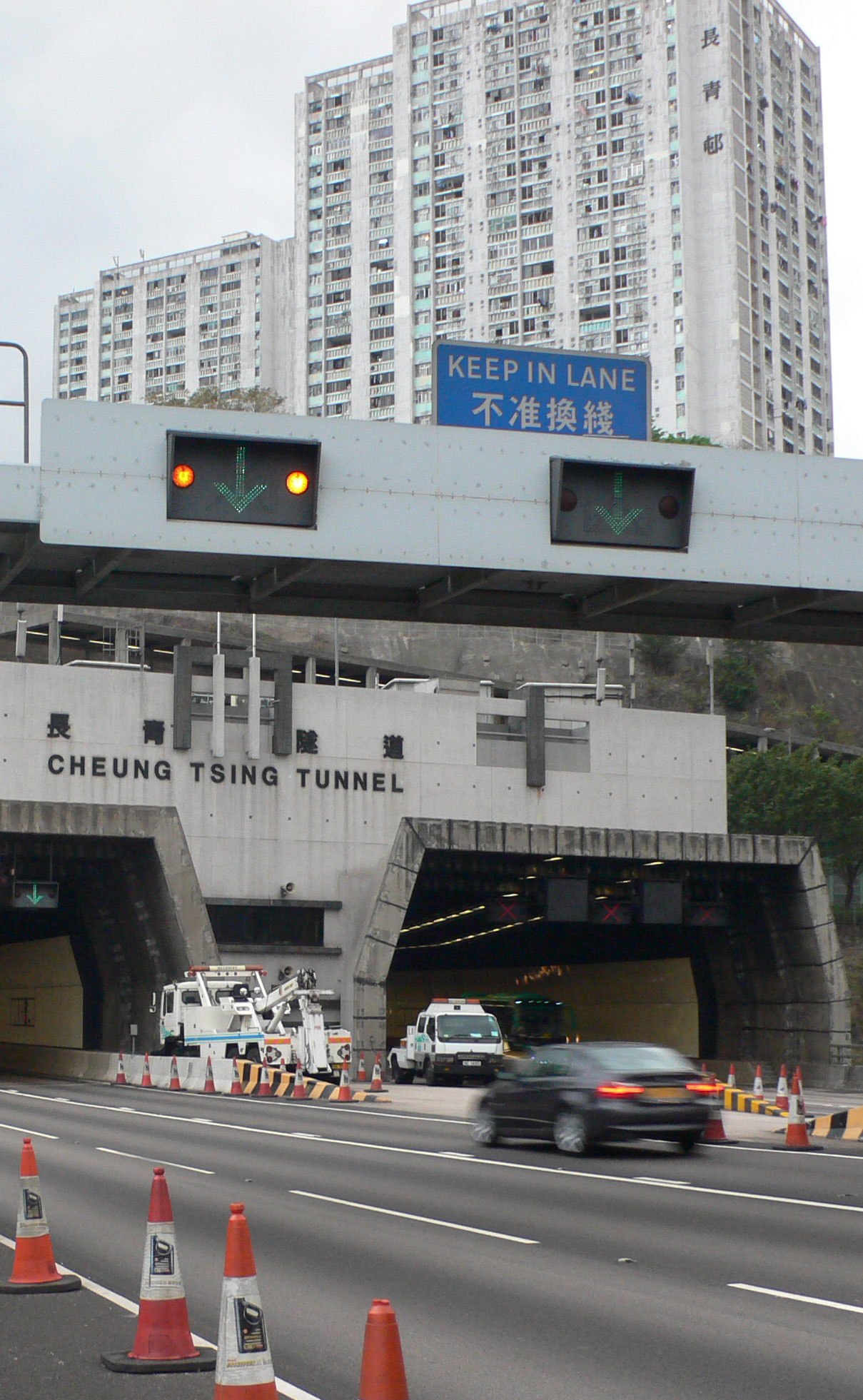
Cheung Tsing Tunnel

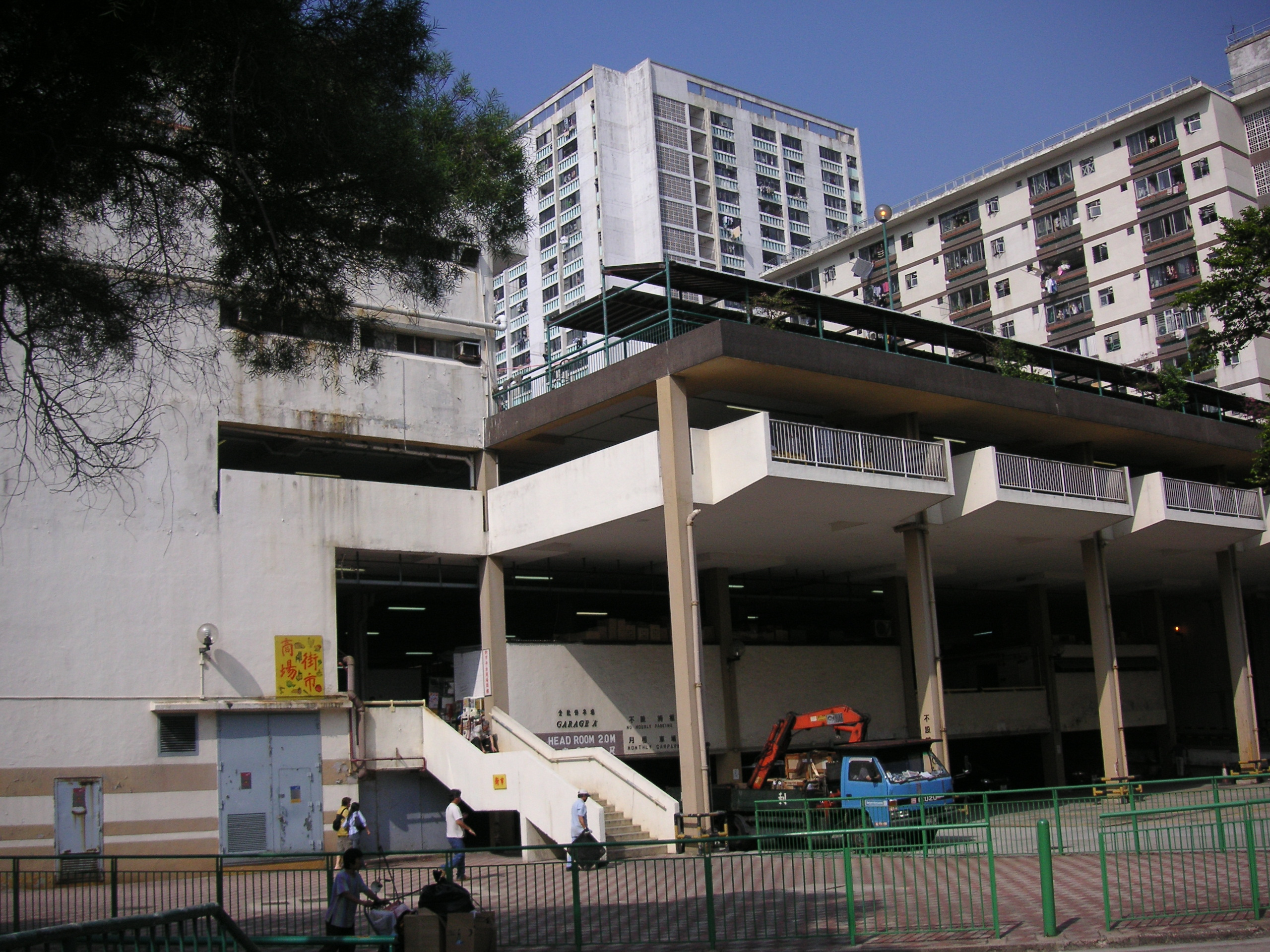
Cheung Ching Commercial Centre

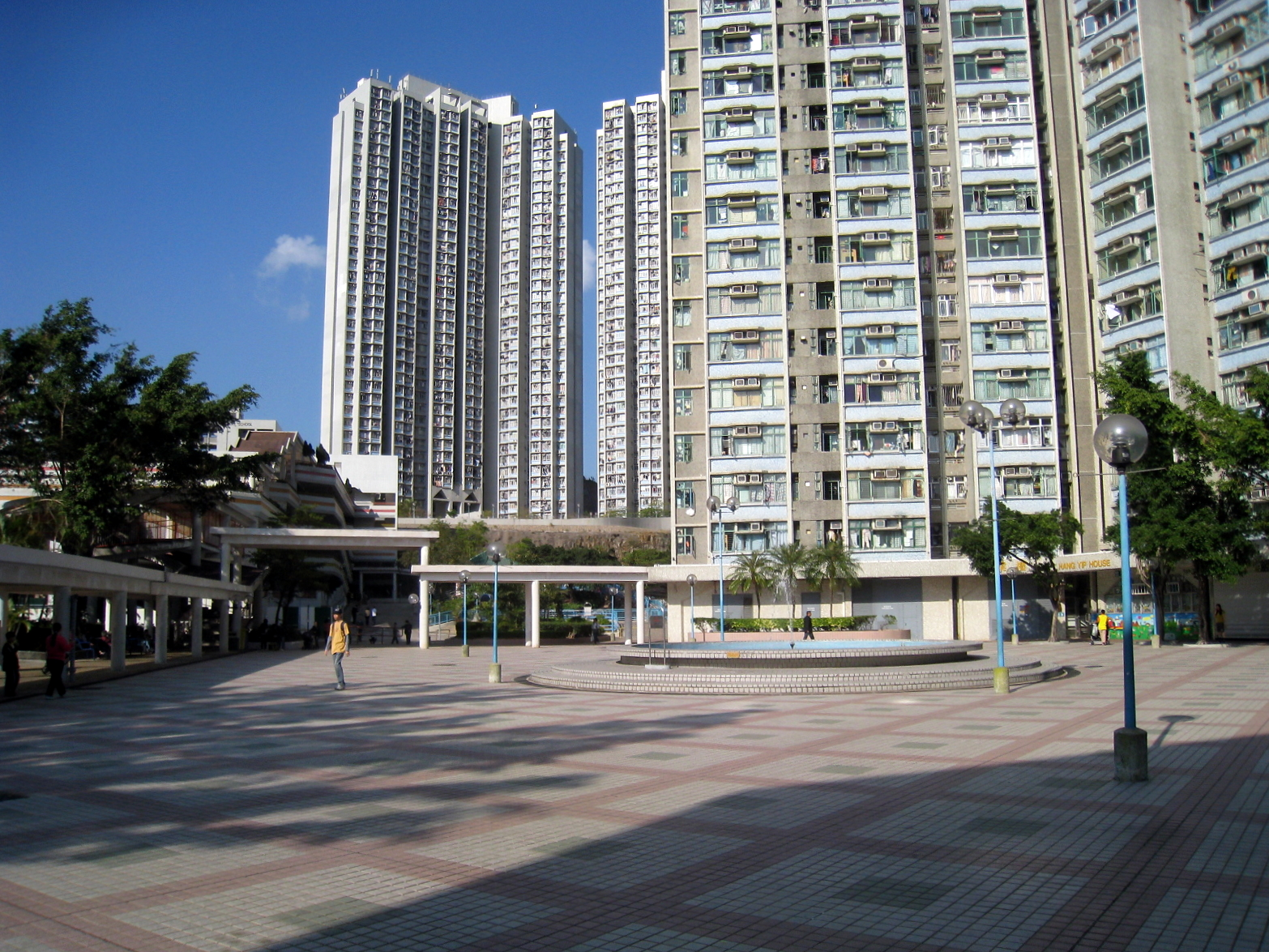
Cheung Hang Estate Entry Plaza

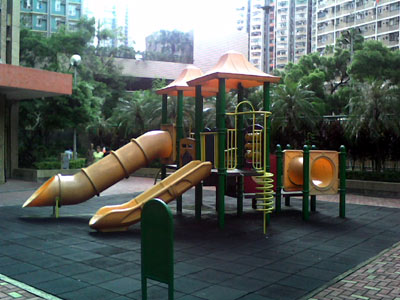
A children's playground in Cheung Fat Estate

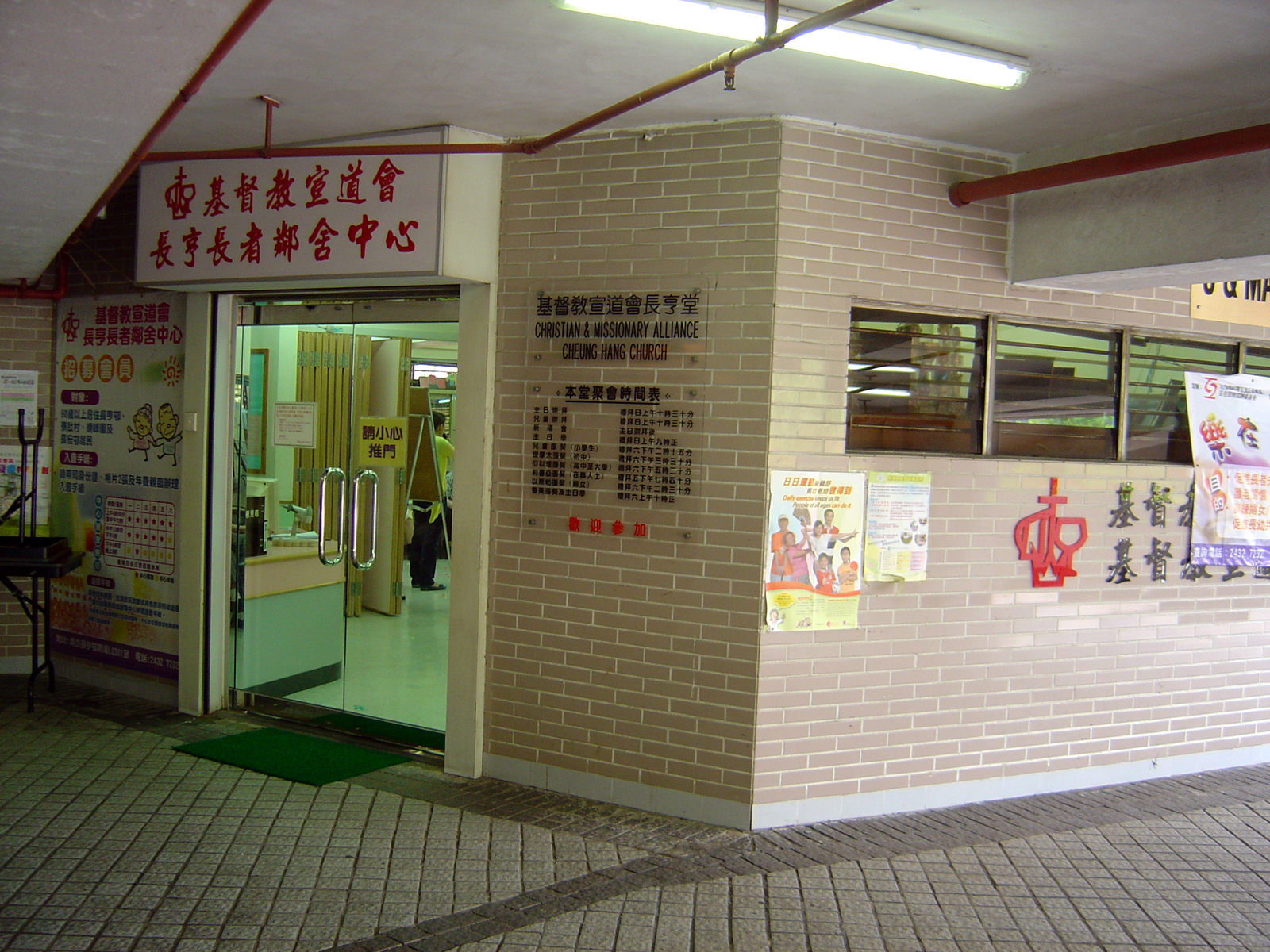
Cheung Hang Church

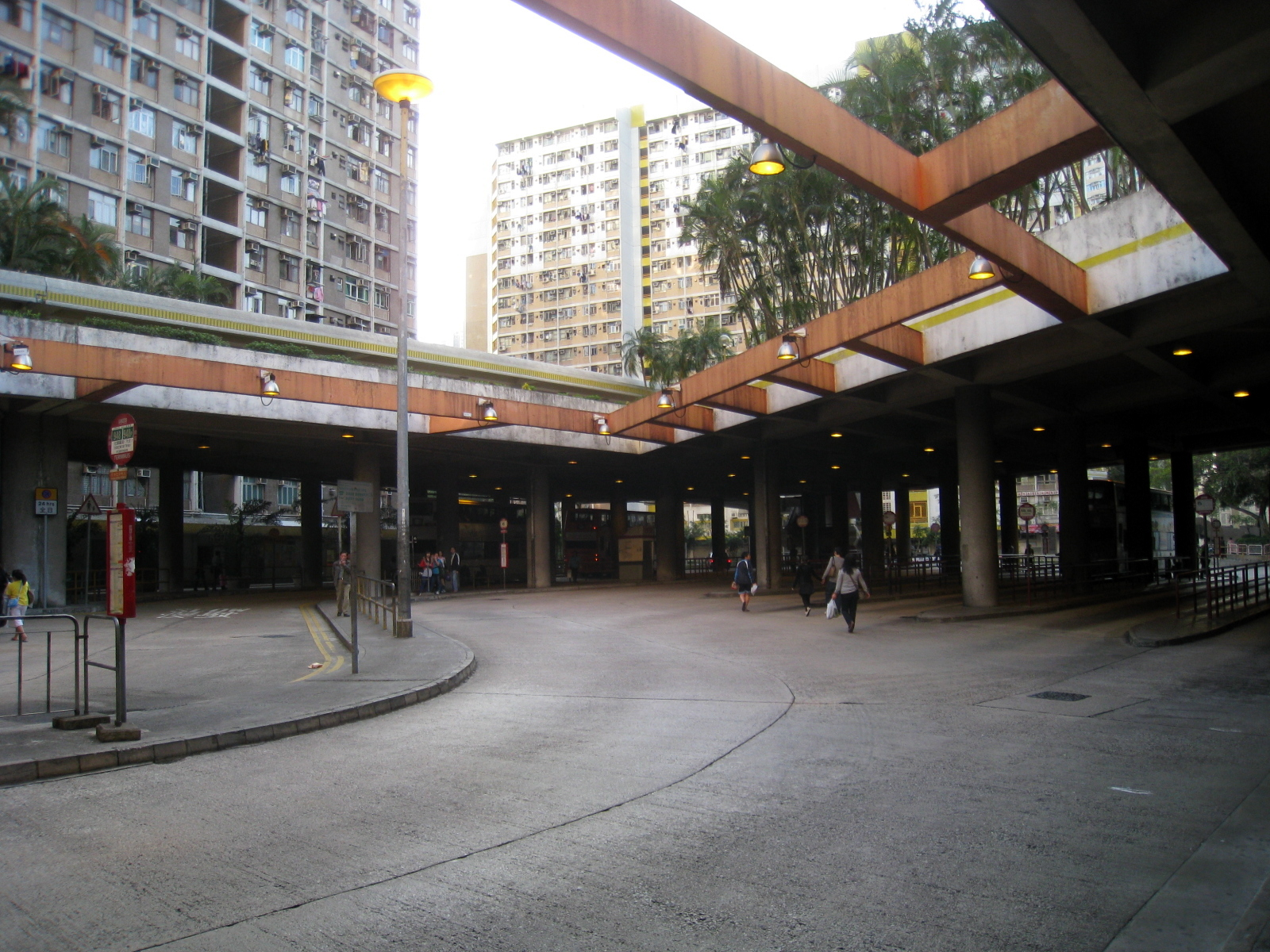
Cheung On Terminus is a very important terminus in Tsing Yi
