= S. C. Gaw Memorial College =

Coordinates: 22°21′09″N 114°06′06″E

Tung Wah Group of Hospitals S. C. Gaw Memorial College
- 東華三院吳祥川紀念中學
- School badge of Tung Wah Group of Hospitals S. C. Gaw Memorial College

Location
- 7 Tsing Sum Street, Town Centre; Tsing Yi; Hong Kong

Information
- Type: Aided, Co-educational
- Motto: 勤儉忠信 (Diligence, Frugality, Loyalty, and Faithfulness)
- Established: 1984; 42 years ago
- Founder: Tung Wah Group of Hospitals
- School district: Kwai Tsing (Also Sham Shui Po and Tsuen Wan)
- Principal: Mr Jack Wong
- Grades: Secondary 1 to 6
- Campus size: 4750 m^{2}
- Campus type: Urban and rural
- Houses: Diligence(勤), Frugality(儉), Loyalty(忠), and Faithfulness(信)
- Colours: Red, Orange, Yellow and Blue
- Song: 東華三院校歌 (School Song of Tung Wah Group of Hospitals)
- Website: http://www.twghscgms.edu.hk/

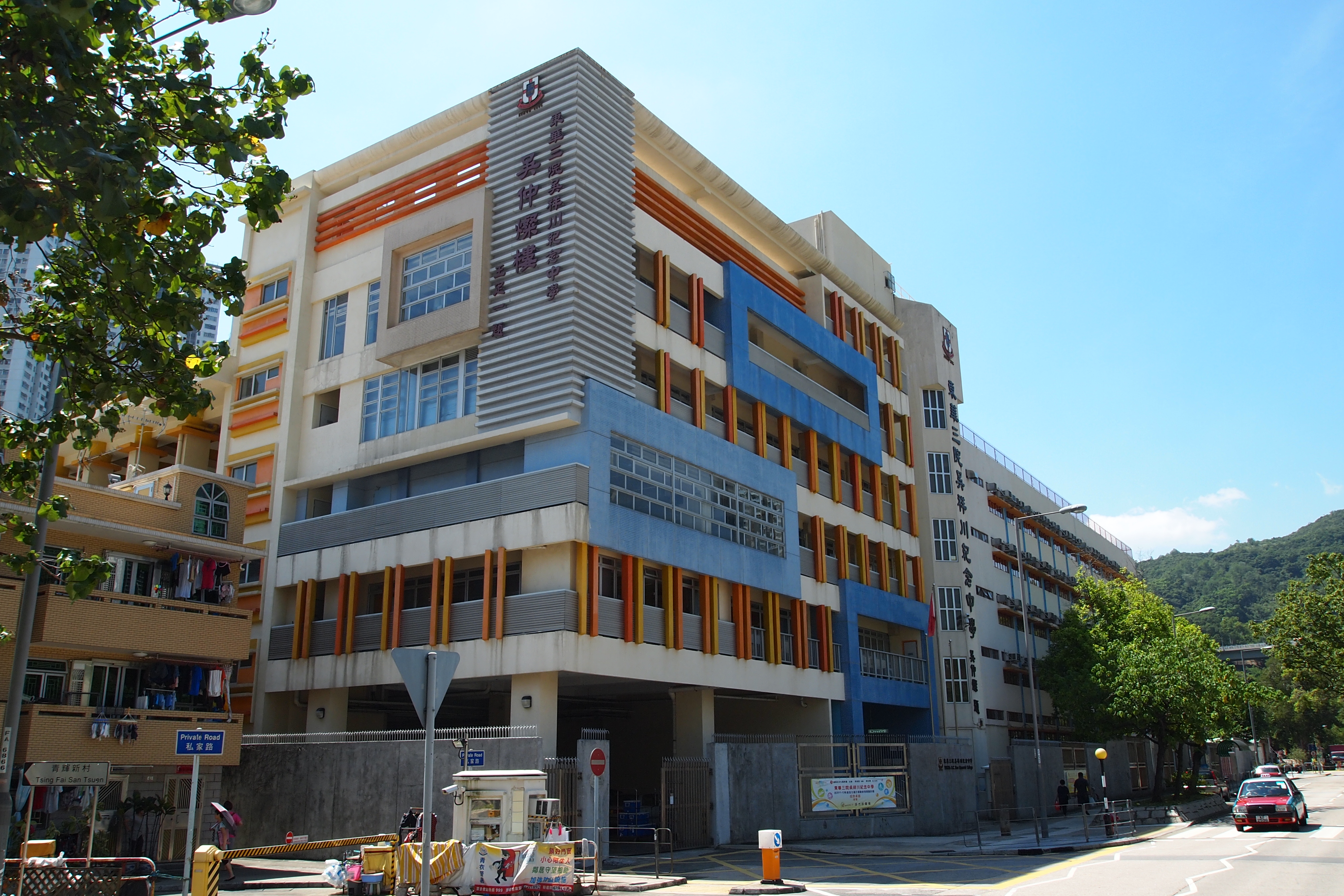
Entrance

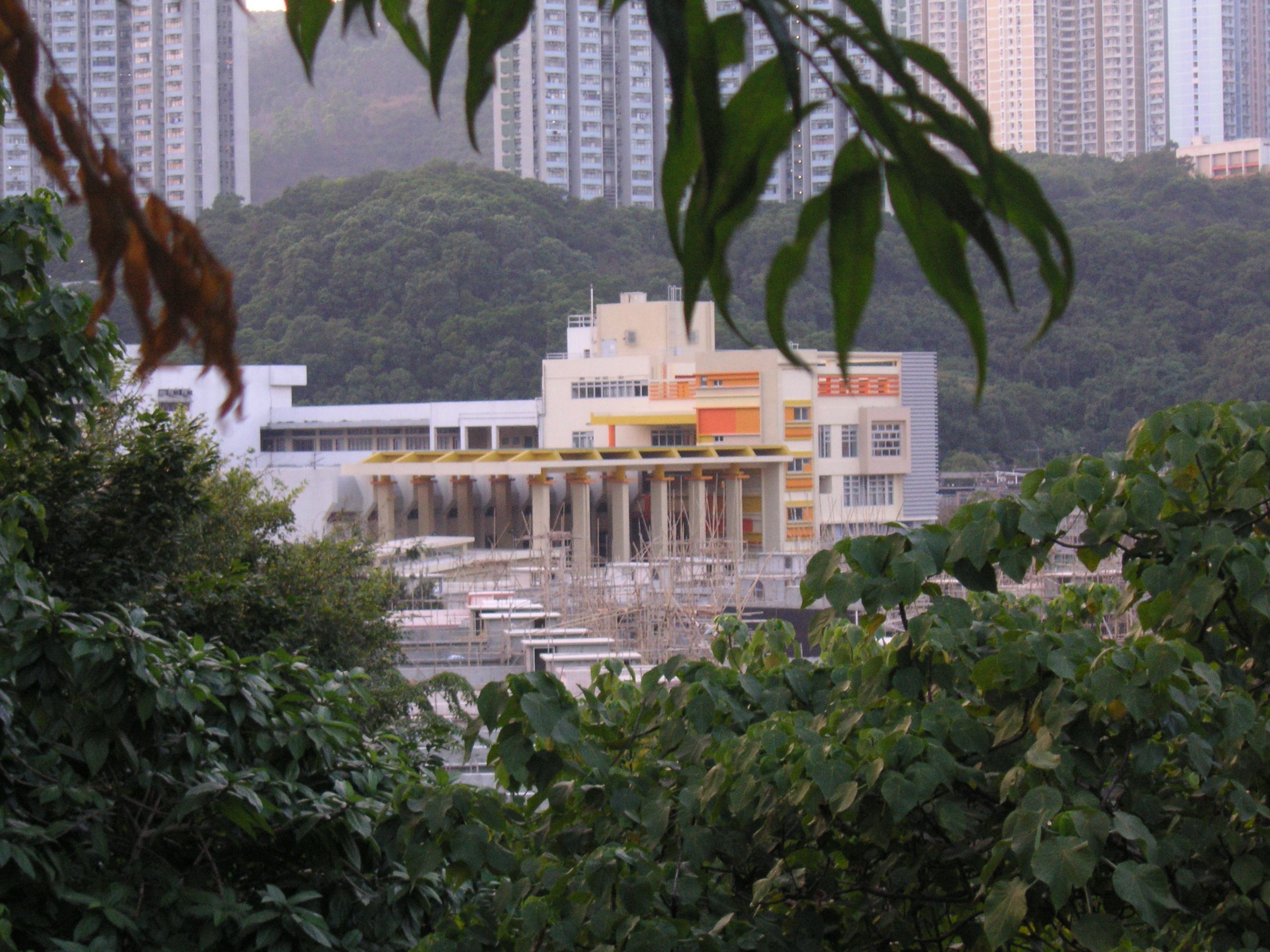
The school building amidst hills and villages with extension under construction

Tung Wah Group of Hospitals S. C. Gaw Memorial College (Chinese: 東華三院吳祥川紀念中學) is a secondary school on Tsing Yi Island, Hong Kong. The school is surrounded by four resited villages, Tai Wong Ha, Yim Tin Kok, Lam Tin, and San Uk.

The College is a co-educational school, accepting both boys and girls. The majority of students are residents on the island though there are many students from other parts of Hong Kong. Established by the Tung Wah Group of Hospitals, a registered charity, in 1984, the school is dependent upon government funding. Instruction is given in English, Cantonese (oral) and Chinese (written).

== History ==
In the early 1980s, as part of the major new town development in the area, the Ha Chung Mei village area close to Tsing Yi Lagoon was reclaimed by the government. As part of a government drive to build more classrooms, the college was established in 1984 by the charity organisation Tung Wah Group of Hospitals. It was the third secondary school to be built on Tsing Yi Island and the 13th secondary school of the charity. S. C. Gaw[[]] (吳祥川) was the father of a former Tung Wah director, Anthony T. Gaw (吳仲燦).

Due to construction delays, it commenced classes in 1984 in 12 borrowed classrooms at nearby Po Leung Kuk 1983 Board of Directors' College. The school moved into its new building in March 1984 and a formal opening ceremony was held in January 1986, the next year, presided over by senior government official Ng Poon-wai (廖本懷).

In 2005, an extension of the school was completed.

In 2015, Latin dancers of the college were awarded prizes at the 90th Blackpool Dance Festival.

== Motto & colours ==
=== School motto ===
The school motto (Chinese: 勤儉忠信; Sidney Lau: Kan^{4}Gim^{6}Jung^{1}Sun^{3}, literally "diligence, frugality, loyalty, belief") is inscribed on a lacquered board in its assembly hall. School houses are named for each of the components of the motto.

=== House and school colours ===
The school divides students and teaching staff into four houses. Houses are named after the school motto, namely, Diligence (勤), Frugality (儉), Loyalty (忠), and Belief (信). Diligence is in red, Frugality orange, Loyalty yellow and Belief blue.

== Principals ==
- Cheng Man-wai (鄭文煒) 1984 - 1997
- Tam Fuk-kei (譚福基) 1997 - 2005
- Ho Lai-po (何禮寶) 2005 - 2010
- Agnes Tang Wai-chun (鄧蕙珍) 2010–2017
- Jack Wong (黃振裘) 2018–Present

== See also ==
- Primary schools of Tung Wah Group of Hospitals in Tsing Yi

== Website ==
"Major events" (in Chinese). Tung Wah Group of Hospitals S. C. Gaw Memorial College. Archived from the original on 6 December 2007.
