= Chung Mei =

Area on the Tsing Yi Island in Hong Kong

Coordinates: 22.351366°N 114.10497°E

- Traditional Chinese: 涌尾
Transcriptions
Yue: Cantonese
- Yale Romanization: Chūng méih
- Jyutping: Cung2 mei5

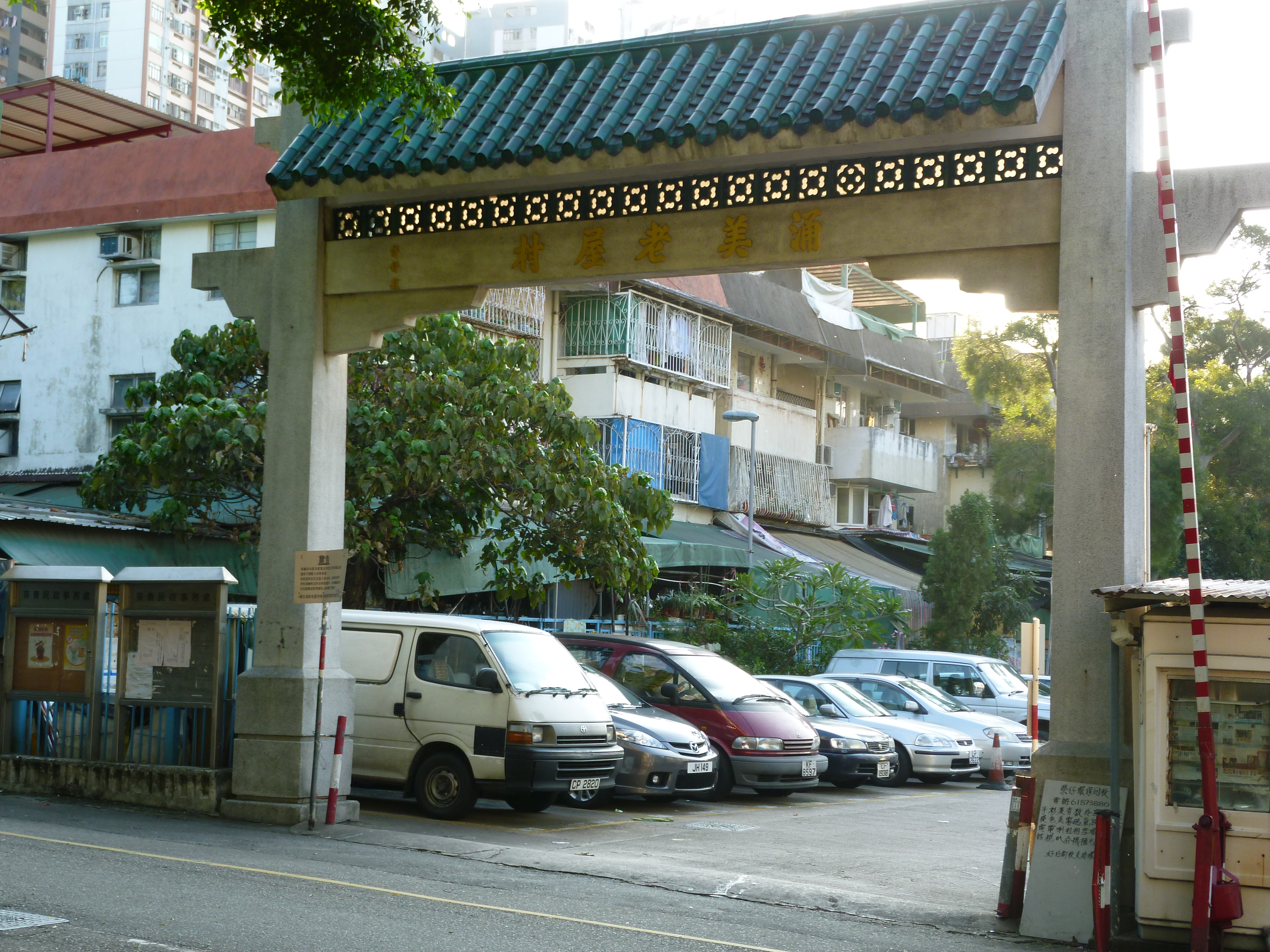
Entrance gate of Chung Mei Lo Uk Tsuen along Sheung Ko Tan Street.

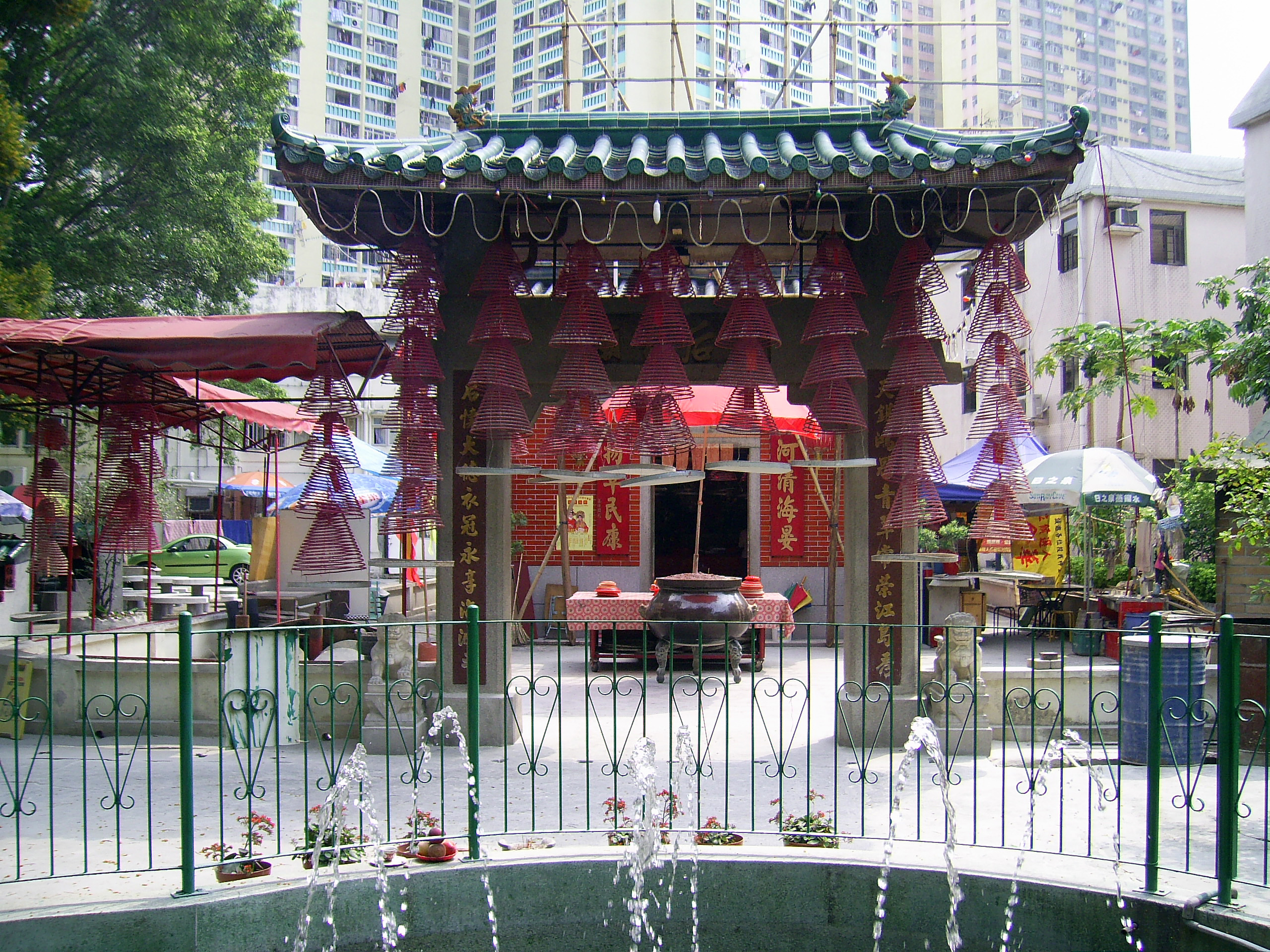
Tin Hau Temple in the vicinity of Chung Mei Lo Uk Tsuen.

Chung Mei is an area on the Tsing Yi Island in Hong Kong. It is also the name of a village on the island.

== Name ==
Chung Mei means the end (尾) of a stream (涌), in Cantonese. It might refer the stream of Liu To or a much shorter where the former villages sited. Both streams are located near the Tsing Yi Lagoon.

== History ==
The original Chung Mei was located on the valley at the present-day Lam Tin Resite Village, below Tiger's Head (虎頭山). Chung Mei was two villages. One was Ha Chung Mei (下涌尾), namely "lower Chung Mei". Another was Sheung Chung Mei (上涌尾), namely "upper Chung Mei". While Ha Chung Mei was sited near the Tsing Yi Lagoon, Sheung Chung Mei was sited higher on valley. The position of Ha Chung Mei is close to present-day TWGHs S. C. Gaw Memorial College. The stream of Liu To and Sheung Chung Mei made cultivation available. According to James Hayes, the cultivation on the island was mainly rice and pineapple.

Along the shore of Tsing Yi Lagoon, from the villages, to the east was Sheung Ko Tan and to the north was Tai Wong Ha. The Tsing Yi Town was at the northeast of Chung Mei, across the lagoon.

In the 1980s, the villages were forced to re-site during the expansion of Tsuen Wan New Town. The original Chung Mei and its surrounding was flatten and reclaimed for re-siting four villages on the Tsing Yi Island. The villages of Chung Mei was combined with Lo Uk (老屋) and relocated east on the higher ground above Sheung Ko Tan. The resited villages was named Chung Mei Lo Uk Tsuen (涌美老屋村) though they are administrated separately. Apart from villages, owing to the destruction of old Tsing Yi Town, many retailers have moved their shops into this village and formed a market. The market still operates everyday even though many new markets were built on the island.

As the new establishment of the village, the name of Chung Mei also commonly refers to its present site and surrounding villages, rather than its former location.

== Administration ==
The original Chung Mei Tsuen was composed of indigenous inhabitants of Chan (陳) family. They have representatives in the Tsing Yi Rural Committee, a composition organisation of Heung Yee Kuk. But after the relocation, many outsiders moved in. The villages thus also has to create one representative for non-indigenous inhabitants.

The villages of Chung Mei and Lo Uk are recognized villages under the New Territories Small House Policy.

== Surroundings ==
West of Chung Mei is an unnamed valley. To its east is resite village of Sheung Ko Tan and Tsing Yi Lutheran Village.

There is one road named after the village, namely Chung Mei Road. The road connects Ching Hong Road and Tsing Yi Heung Sze Wui Road. It is one of major roads of the island.

Across Chung Mei Road is Cheung Hong Estate, the largest public housing estates on the island.

== See also ==
- List of villages in Hong Kong
