= Sai Shan =

Hill in Hong Kong

Coordinates: 22.3446°N 114.1025°E

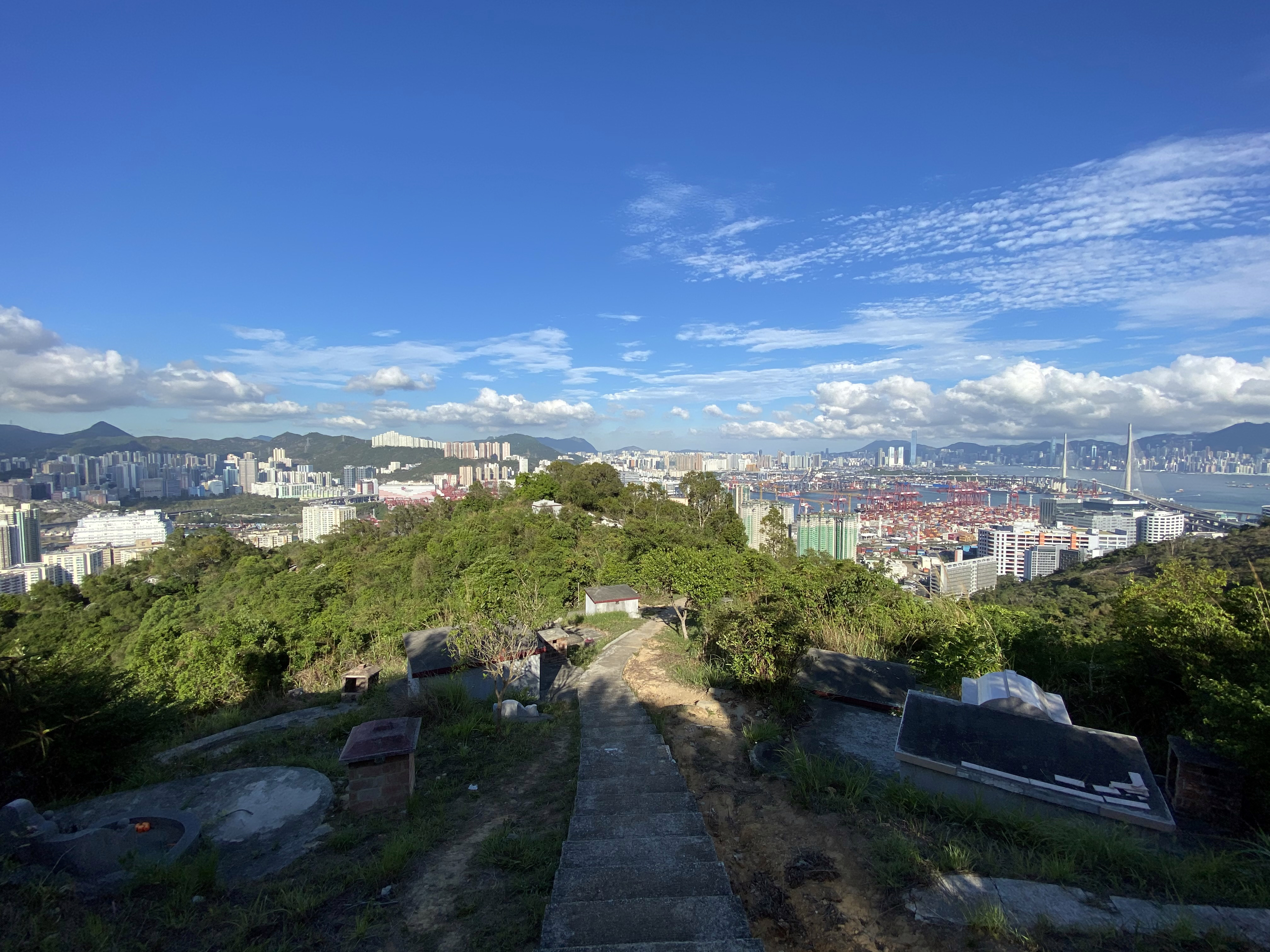
View from Sai Shan.

Sai Shan (Chinese: 細山) is a hill behind Mayfair Gardens on Tsing Yi Island, Hong Kong. The hill is east of and beneath the northern peak of Tsing Yi Peak. A village, Sai Shan Village is in the valley between Sai Shan and Tsing Yi Peak. A road, Sai Shan Road between Mayfair Gardens and Hong Kong Institute of Vocational Education (Tsing Yi) is named after the hill.
