= Tsing Yi Rural Committee =

- Traditional Chinese: 青衣鄉事委員會
- Simplified Chinese: 青衣乡事委员会
Transcriptions
Standard Mandarin
- Hanyu Pinyin: Qīngyī Xiāng Shì Wěiyuánhuì
Yue: Cantonese
- Jyutping: cing1 ji1 hoeng1 si6 wai2 jyun4 wui6*2

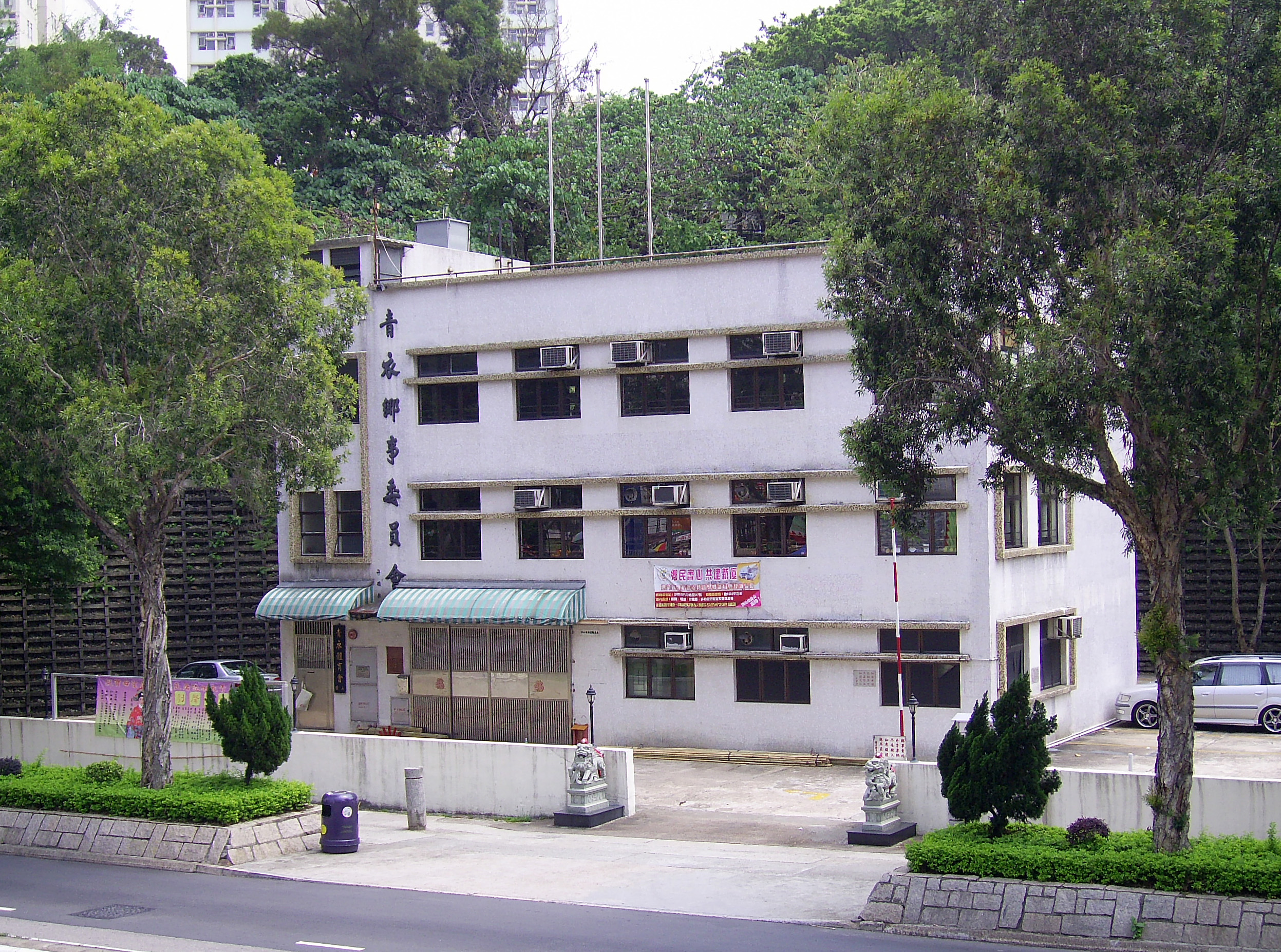
Tsing Yi Rural Committee building

Tsing Yi Rural Committee (Chinese: 青衣鄉事委員會) is a rural committee dealing with matters of the village of Tsing Yi Island in Hong Kong.

== Representatives ==
Village committee representation
Village	Number of Indigenous Inhabitant Representative [原居民代表]	Number of Resident Representative [居民代表]	Notes
Chung Mei Tsuen (涌美村)	3	1	
Lo Uk Tsuen (老屋村)	1	1	Note: Chung Mei Tsuen and Lo Uk Tsuen are mixed into one village named Chung Mei Lo Uk Tsuen (涌尾老屋村). Tsing Yi residents call this village Chung Mei Tsuen.
Tai Wong Ha Resite Village (大王下新村) or Tai Wong Ha Tsuen (大王下村)	5	1	
Sun Uk Resite Village (新屋新村) or San Uk Tsuen (新屋村)	1	1	
Yim Tin Kok Resite Village (鹽田角新村) or Yim Tin Kok Tsuen (鹽田角村)	1	1	
Lam Tin Resite Village (藍田新村) or Lam Tin Tsuen (藍田村)	2	1	Note: The approximately four resite villages are relocated together and are usually referred as Sai Tsuen 四村
Fung Shue Wo Resite Village (楓樹窩新村) or Fung Shu Wo Tsuen (楓樹窩村)	1	0	Note: In Fung Shue Wo there are two villages Tsing Yu New Village (青裕新村) and Tsing Yi Hui (青衣墟)
Fishermen's Village and St. Paul's Village (漁民村及聖保祿村)	0	1	
Tsing Yi Lutheran Village (信義新村)			
Liu To Village (寮肚村)			
Ko Tan Village (高灘村)			
Sai Shan Village (細山村)			Still exists?

== See also ==
- List of villages in Hong Kong
