= Tsing Yi Police Station =

Only police station on Tsing Yi Island, Hong King

Coordinates: 22.3512°N 114.1075°E

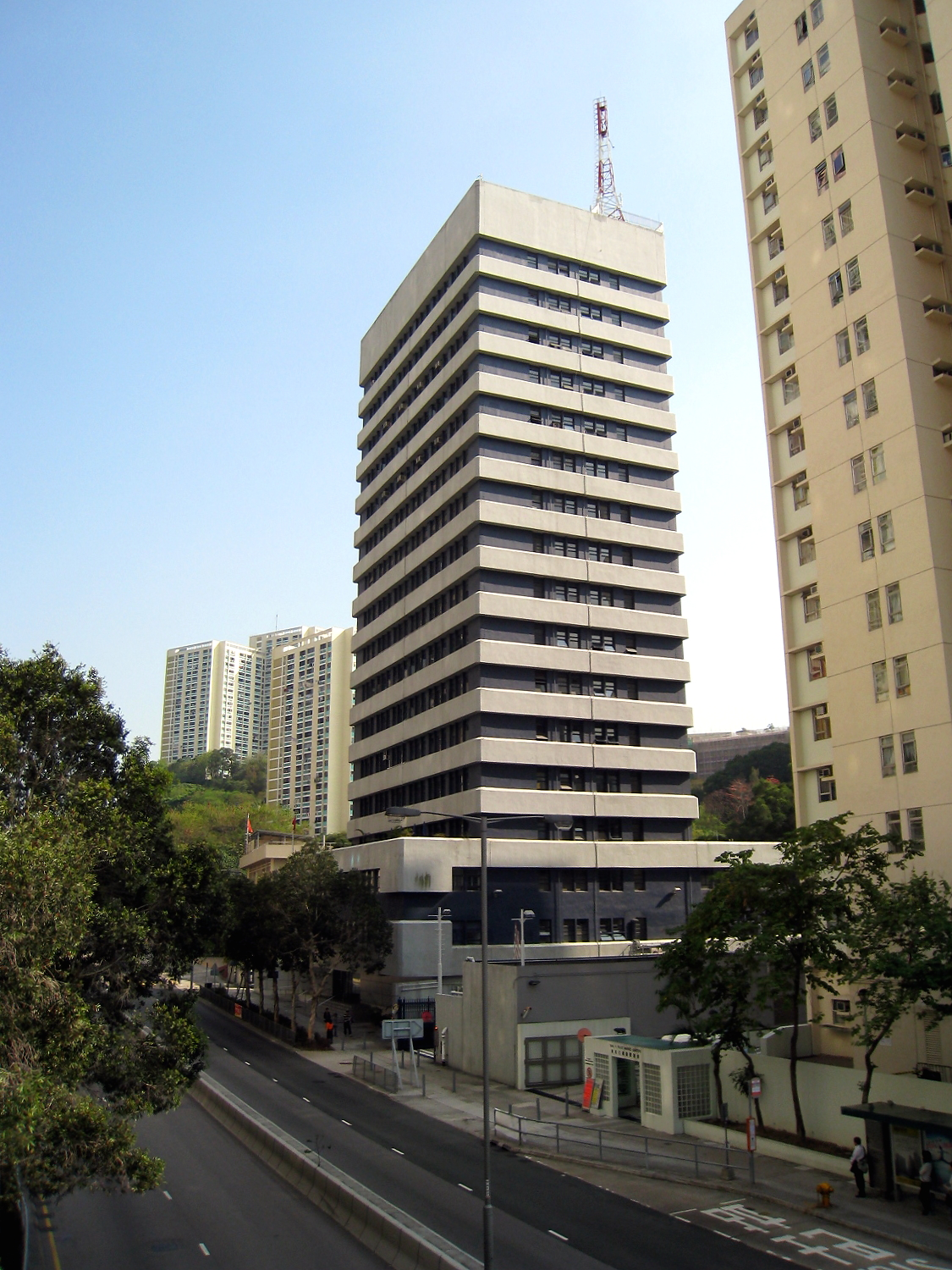
Tsing Yi Police Station along Tsing Yi Heung Sze Wui Road, in 2008.

Tsing Yi Police Station (Chinese: 青衣警署), once also known as Tsing Yi Division Police Station (青衣分區警署) is the only police station on Tsing Yi Island in Hong Kong. The station is located at Tsing Yi Heung Sze Wui Road, between Tsing Yi Police Married Quarters and Tsing Yi Fire Station, below Chung Mei Tsuen of Ha Ko Tan. Its front faces Greenfield Garden, a private housing estate.

The police station is the headquarters of the Tsing Yi Division, under the New Territories South Region. It was designed to be a district police station (警區警署) for the island. But, the population does not grow as quickly as expected and still under 200 thousand. It thus remains as a division police station (分區警署).

The police station includes a report centre.

Some operational units of the New Territories South Regional Headquarters occupied part of the Tsing Yi Police Station until mid-2005 when they were relocated to new building in Tsuen Wan. This caused attention from the Audit Commission who recommended that the Commissioner of Police review the use of unused space at the station.

== History ==
After the commencement of new town development on the island, the Royal Hong Kong Police Force established a neighbourhood policing office (派出所) in public housing estates like Cheung Ching Estate and Cheung Hong Estate. As the population grew rapidly in 1980s, a new police station is established.

== Events ==
- Tsui Po-ko, a police officer involved in a fatal gun fight with other police officers in Tsim Sha Tsui, the murder of another police officer Leung Shing-yan and the robbery of a branch office of Hong Kong Jockey Club, served at Tsing Yi Police Station after murdering Leung.
- On 11 October 2006, a police officer uncovered that a police bullet was replaced with non-police one.
