= Tsing Yi Heung Sze Wui Road =

Road in Tsing Yi, Hong Kong

Coordinates: 22.35009°N 114.10865°E

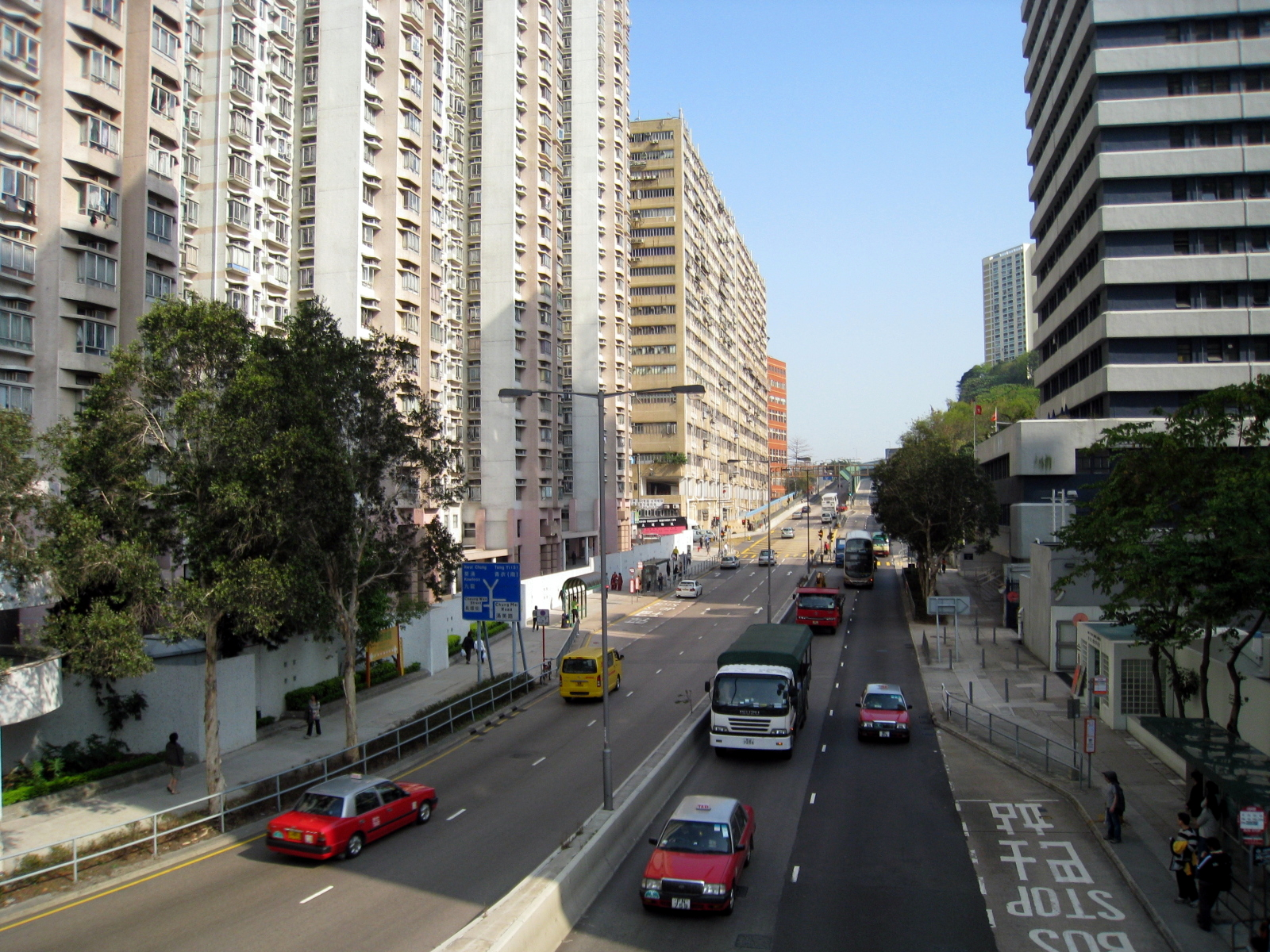
Tsing Yi Heung Sze Wui Road, with Greenfield Garden on the left and Tsing Yi Police Station on the right.

Tsing Yi Heung Sze Wui Road (Chinese: 青衣鄉事會路; Cantonese Yale: ching1 yi1 heung1 si6 wui2 lou6) is one of the oldest roads on the Tsing Yi Island, in Hong Kong.

It was built to connect Tsing Yi Town and Tsing Yi Bridge when the bridge was being built. The name "Tsing Yi Heung Sze Wui" derives from the local Cantonese pronunciation of Tsing Yi Rural Committee.

After the reclamation of Tsing Yi Lagoon and Tsing Yi Bay, the road ended at Chun Kwan Temple. The office building of the Tsing Yi Rural Committee is very close to the temple, though it is on Fung Shue Wo Road. Tsing Yi Fire Station and Tsing Yi Police Station are also on the road.

== See also ==
- List of streets and roads in Hong Kong
