= Mayfair Gardens =

Housing estate in Tsing Yi, Hong Kong

Coordinates: 22°20′39″N 114°06′25″E

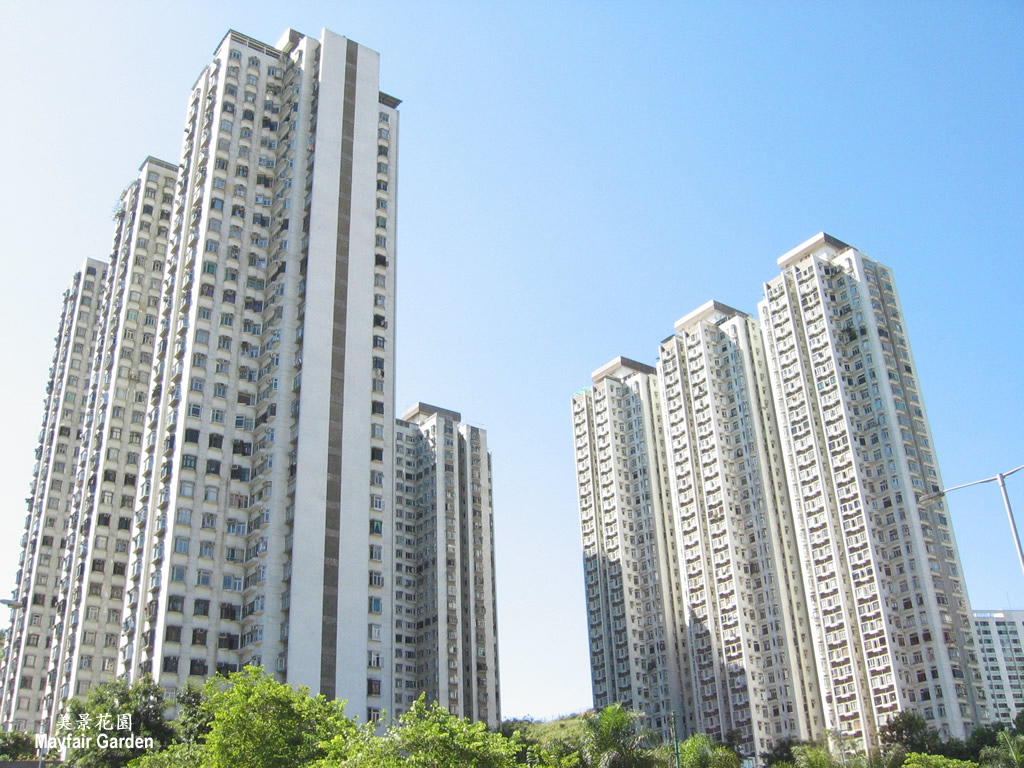
Mayfair Gardens

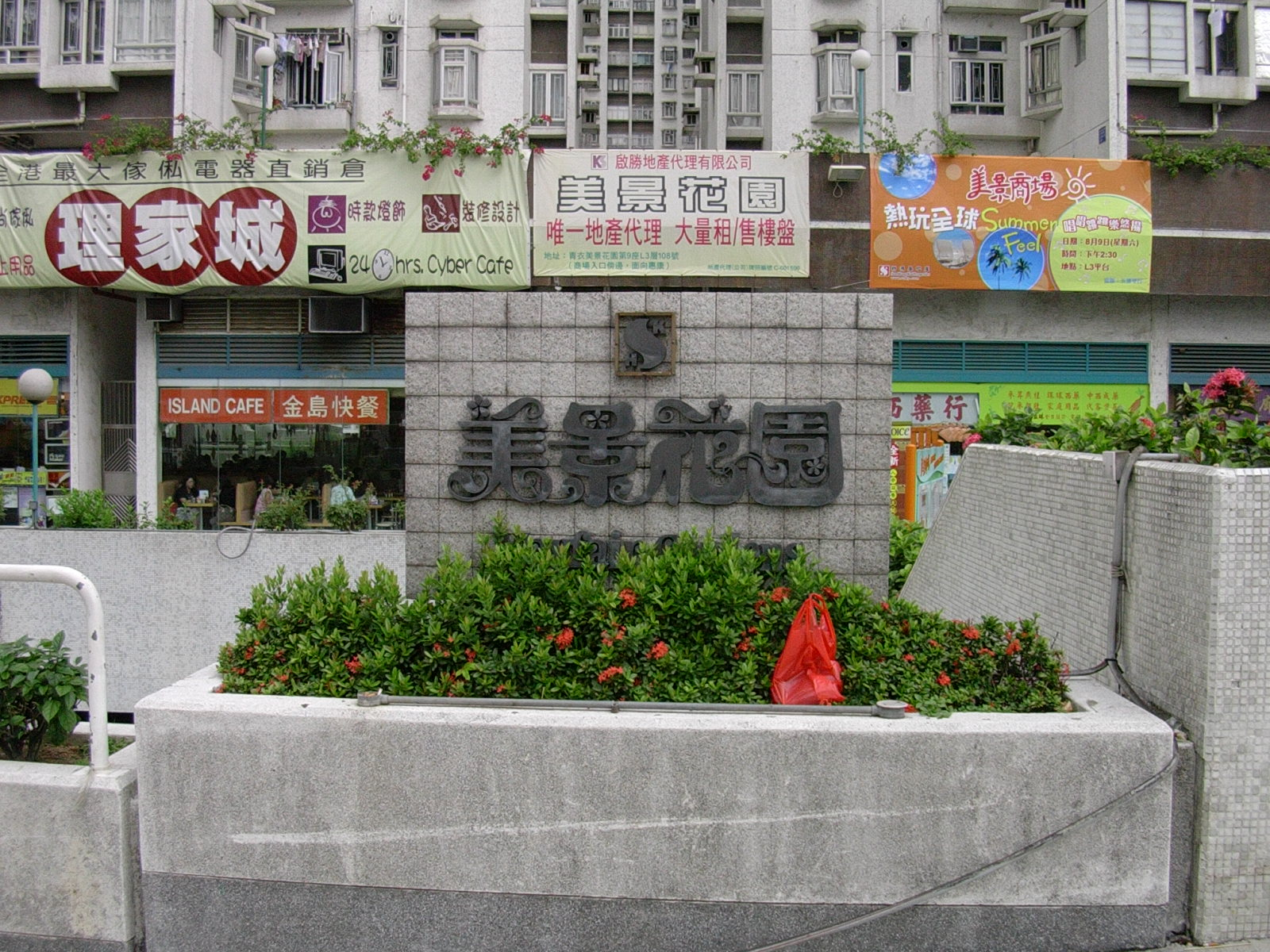
Ching Hong Road entrance

Mayfair Gardens (Chinese: 美景花園) is the first private housing estate on Tsing Yi, Hong Kong. It was built by Sun Hung Kai Properties and established between 1982 and 1984. The estate is composed of eight residential buildings, namely Blocks 5 to 12.

== Estate information ==
- Number of blocks: 8
- The phase that each block belongs to:
  - Phase I: Block 6, Block 8, Block 10, Block 11, Block 12
  - Phase II: Block 5, Block 7, Block 9
- Occupation Date:
  - Phase I: 1982
  - Phase II: 1984
- The total number of flat:1,912

The original plan of the estate includes block 1-4, however the location of those blocks is too close to the oil depot, so block 1-4 are not built.

The original location for block 1-4 becomes the location of the park now, and the original location of the oil depot becomes the location of Rambler Crest today.

== Location ==
The estate was built on the site of Sai Shan Village. To the east of the estate is Cheung Ching Estate and to the west IVE (Tsing Yi). The estate is surrounded by Sai Shan and Tsing Yi Peak to the north and west.

== Facilities ==
Mayfair Garden has facilities including private clubs, swimming pool, park, car park, playground, basketball court, tennis court, etc. There is also a small shopping mall.

The total area of the shopping mall is 69,490 square feet. The shops including 7-Eleven, Fairwood, 759 Store, Wellcome and restaurants providing different nations' cuisine.

== Withdrawal of development of Block 1, 2 and 3 ==
Twelve blocks were originally proposed for the site. During the 1980s, there was a growing concern about the environmental safety of Tsing Yi Island. The proximity of Mobil oil depot to Mayfair Gardens triggered the protest of the islanders. The residents demanded a relocation of the depot to a more distant area. The depot remained unmoved, but the planned development of Blocks 1, 2 and 3, together with a bus terminus and a cinema, were forced to be withdrawn.

Although the results of the protests were not what the campaigners desired at the time, this was one of the main examples of a civil protest movement in Hong Kong in the mid-1980s. Actions against the government were organised by residents and social workers. The movement encouraged greater participation in newly devised District Board and resulted in more public involvement in policy formulation.

The area originally intended for Blocks 1-3 is now a basketball court, a tennis court and a playground, so the estate is open to Victoria Harbour despite the existence of the newly built Container Terminal 9 and Rambler Crest which partially blocks the sea view. The oil depot has since been relocated to the west shore of the island, separated from the residential population by the geographic barrier of Tsing Yi Peak.

== Access ==
Following the partial withdrawal of the development, Sai Shan Road is the only road access to the housing estate. Its bus terminus is installed at the road. Most residents on the other hand use the footbridge entrance at Ching Hong Road.

== Anecdote ==
There was an incident that a 12-year-old girl committed suicide because of the academic problem in 2008, therefore some people think that the estate is haunted.
