= Chun Kwan Temple =

Temple on Tsing Yi Island in Hong Kong

Coordinates: 22.352199°N 114.106782°E

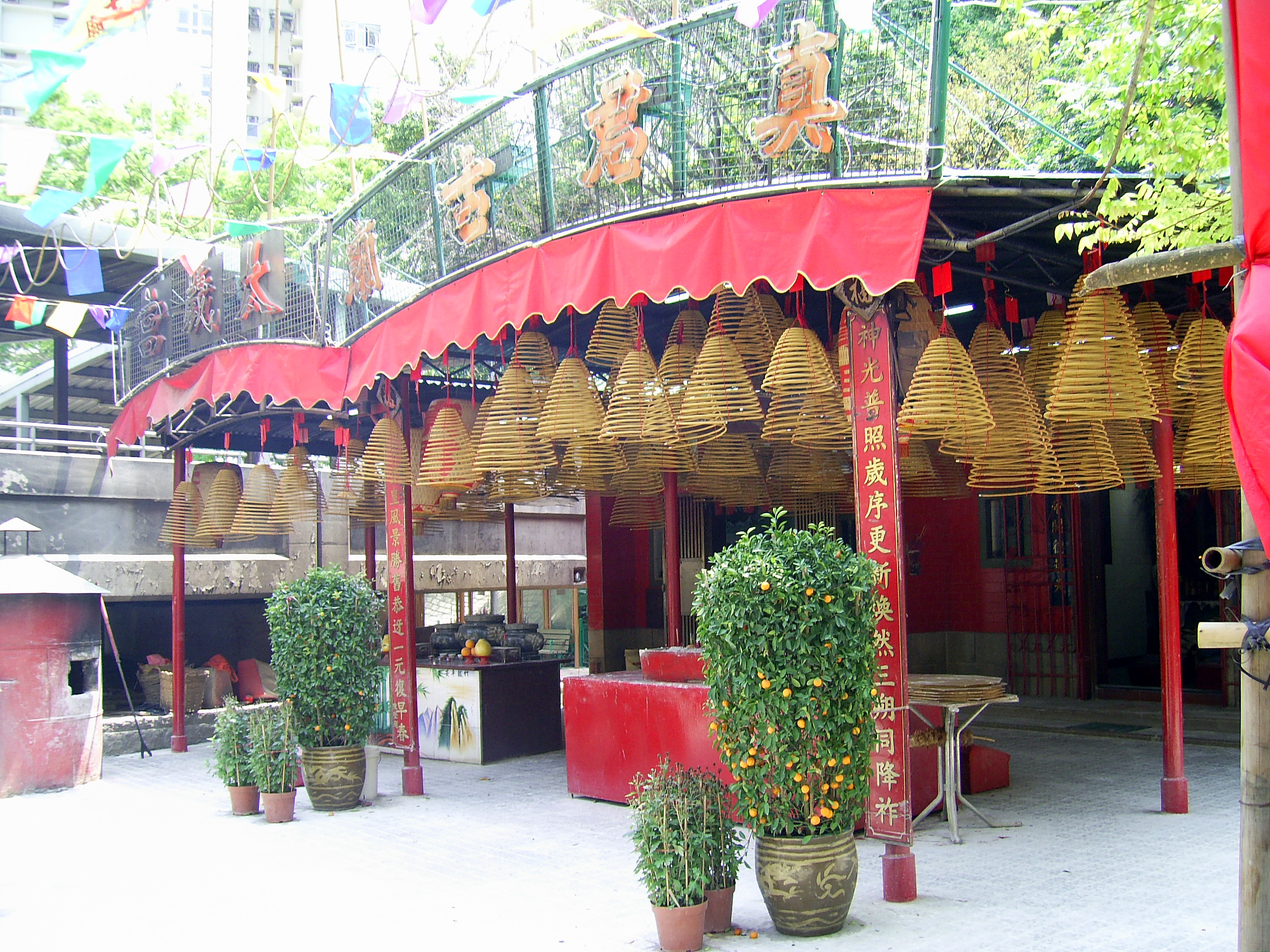
Chun Kwan Temple, Tsing Yi

Chun Kwan Temple (Chinese: 真君廟; Jyutping: zan1 gwan1 miu6) is a temple dedicated to Chun Kwan on Tsing Yi Island in Hong Kong. Chun Kwan was a commoner who had combatted pirates during the South Song Dynasty (960–1279).

The original temple was built on the waterfront 100 years ago and later moved to its present location on the junction of Tsing Yi Heung Sze Wui Road and Fung Shue Wo Road.

During Chun Kwan's Birthday, on the 15th day of the third lunar month, traditional Cantonese opera performances are staged for 5 days.

== See also ==
- Chun Kwan
- Tsing Yi Bamboo Theatre
- Tin Hau temples in Hong Kong
- Hip Tin temples in Hong Kong
- Kwan Tai temples in Hong Kong
- Places of worship in Hong Kong
