= Chun Kwan =

Chinese deity

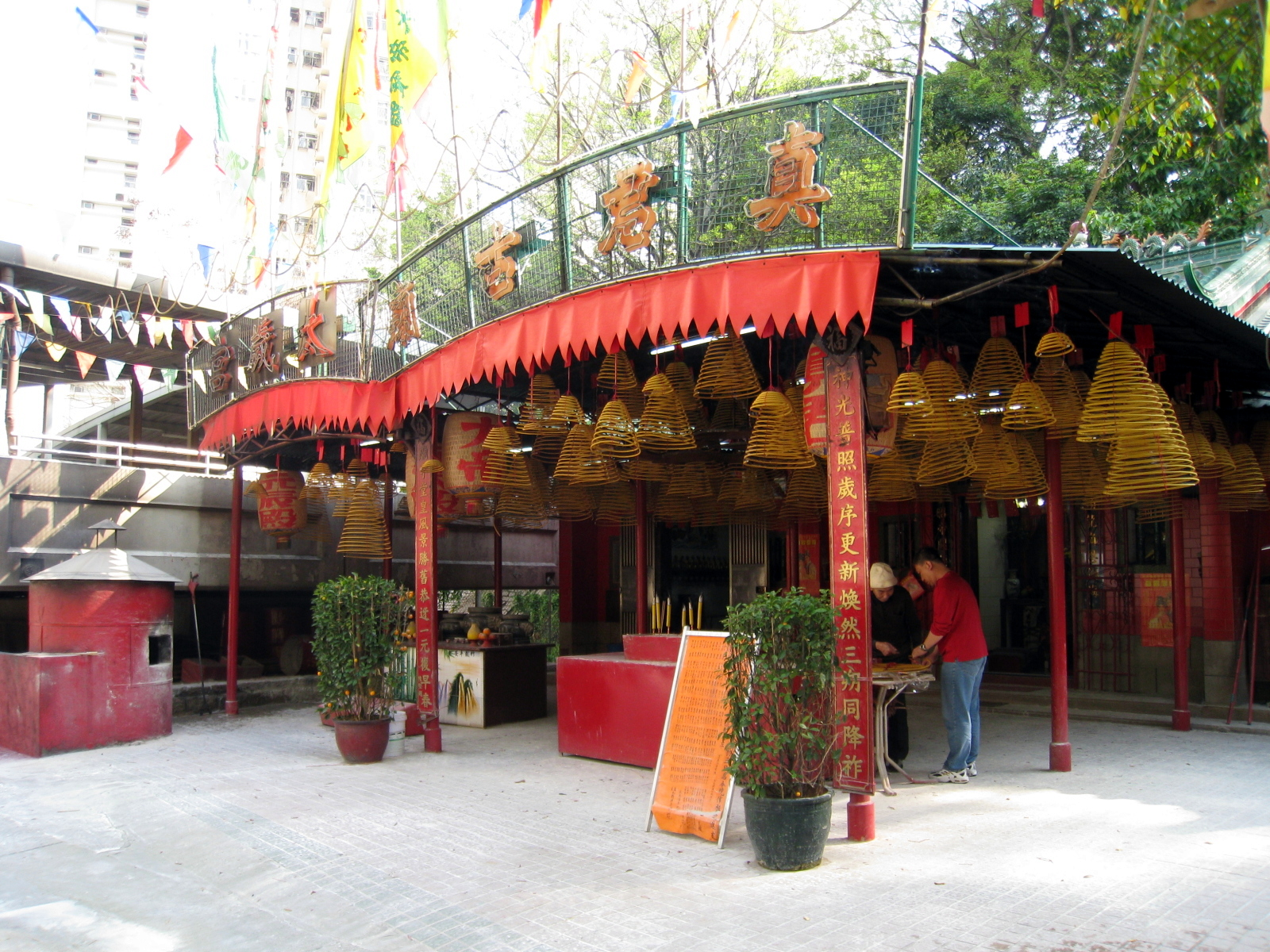
Chun Kwan Temple in Hong Kong

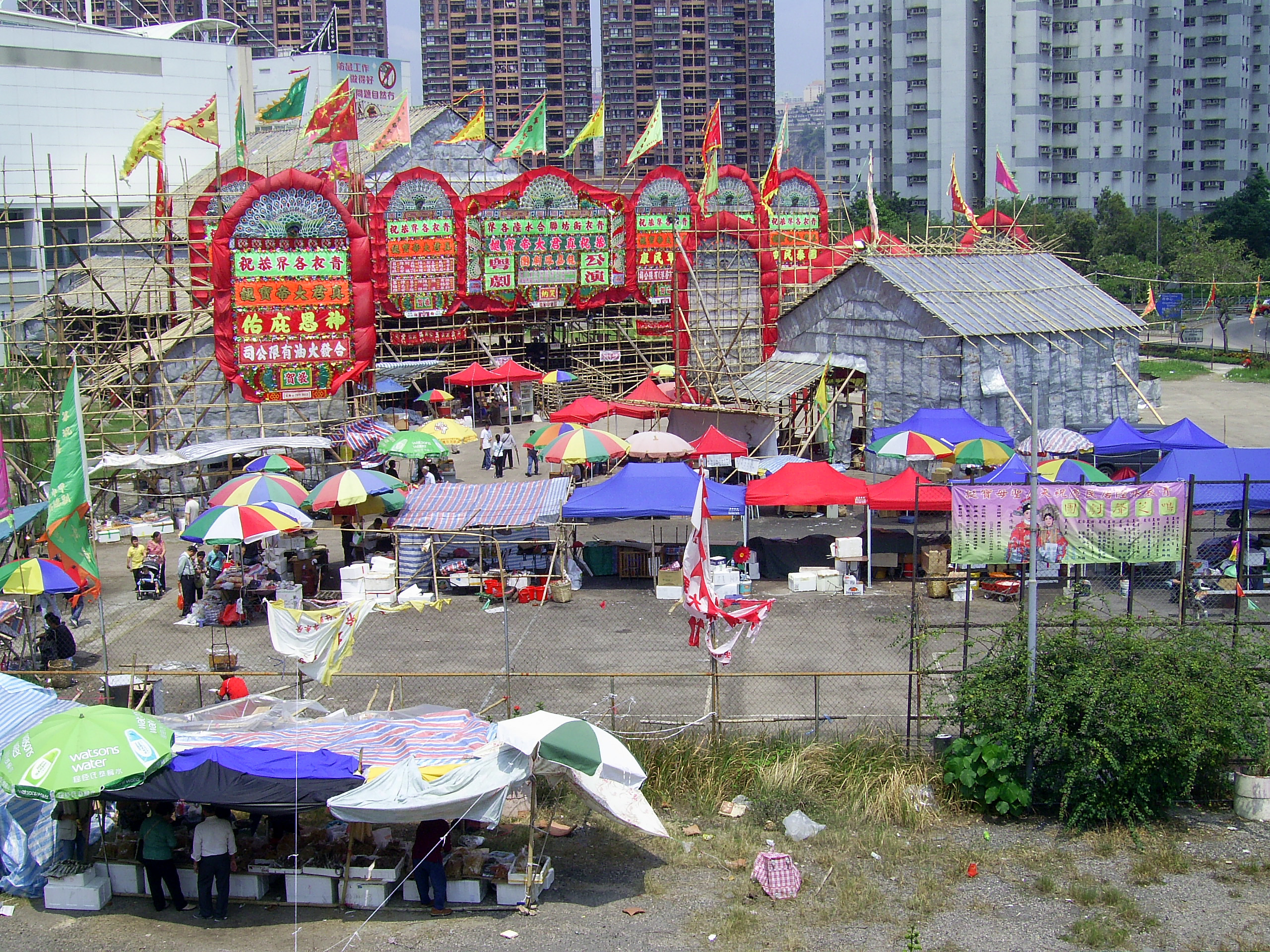
Chun Kwan Birthday Festival on Tsing Yi Island of Hong Kong in 2009

Chun Kwan (Chinese: 真君) is a deity in China with surname Ng (吳). At the reign of Emperor Lizong in South Song Dynasty, Guangdong was frequently raided by pirates. The government's military having little success against the pirates, the people suffered. Ng led a force and annihilated the bands of pirates and returned peace to people.

After his death, his spirit performed good deeds in Lung Kong and the Emperor awarded him the title of Chun Kwan Tai Tai (真君大帝) and built temples for him.

He has done various kind acts on Tsing Yi Island of Hong Kong and a memorial was inscribed in Chun Kwan Temple on the island.

In Thailand, he is known as "Chao Pho Ton Sai" (เจ้าพ่อต้นไทร; lit: tutelary of banyan tree), his temples are rarely and little well known. One of them is located on the 4th floor of the suki restaurant parking lot in Soi Texas, Bangkok's Chinatown quarter, which is usually rarely open to the public. But will open only during the festival.

== See also ==
- Chun Kwan Temple
- Tsing Yi Bamboo Theatre
