= Tsing Yi Fire Station =

Oldest fire station on the Tsing Yi Island, Hong Kong

Coordinates: 22.350956°N 114.107933°E

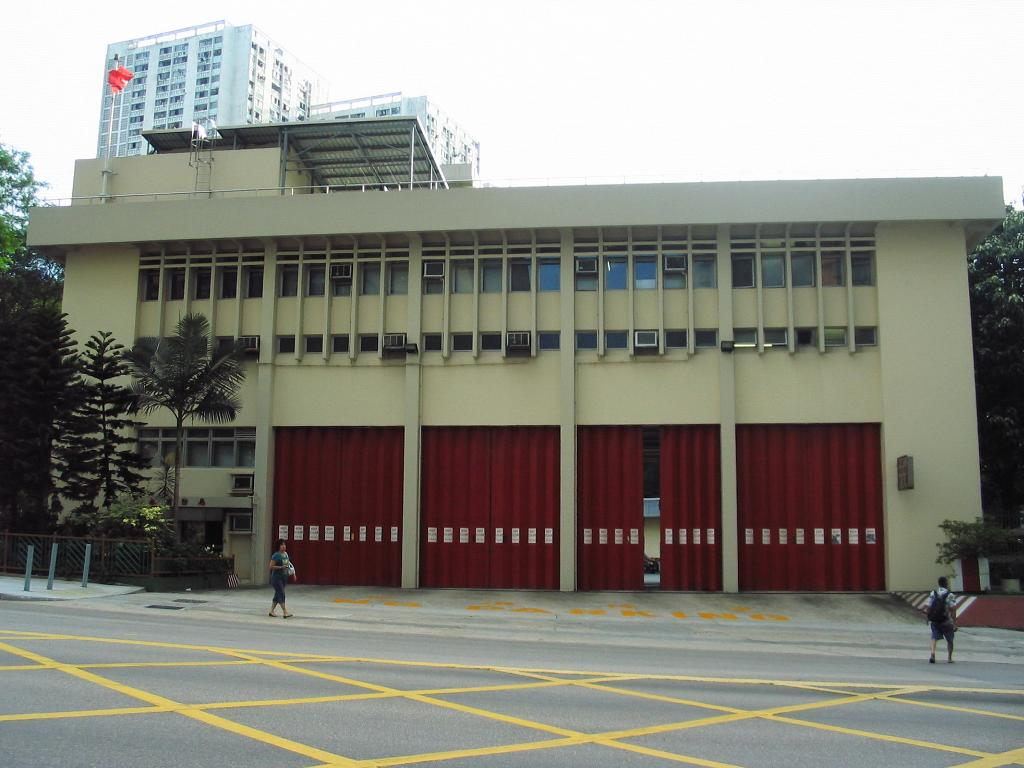
Tsing Yi Fire Station

Tsing Yi Fire Station (Chinese: 青衣消防局) is the first fire station on the Tsing Yi Island, New Territories, Hong Kong. Located at the T-junction of Tsing Yi Heung Sze Wui Road and Cheung Wan Street on east side of the island, the station was once the sole station to cater the need for the rapid increase of population since late 1970s and the oil storage and heavy industries in the south and west.

To relieve the burden of the station, a new station, Tsing Yi South Fire Station, was established in the southwest at Tsing Yi Road near Nam Wan, handling fire for industries and increasing number of oil depot.

The fire station is located between Tsing Yi Police Station, Chung Mei Road Temporary Playground, a telephone exchange of PCCW and under a Tin Hau Temple.

Apart from the main building of the station, it also had a drill tower and a foam store.

== See also ==
- List of fire stations in Hong Kong
