= Sai Shan Village =

Coordinates: 22.3438°N 114.1060°E

- Traditional Chinese: 細山村
Transcriptions
Yue: Cantonese
- Yale Romanization: Sai sāan chyūn
- Jyutping: Sai3 saan1 cyun1

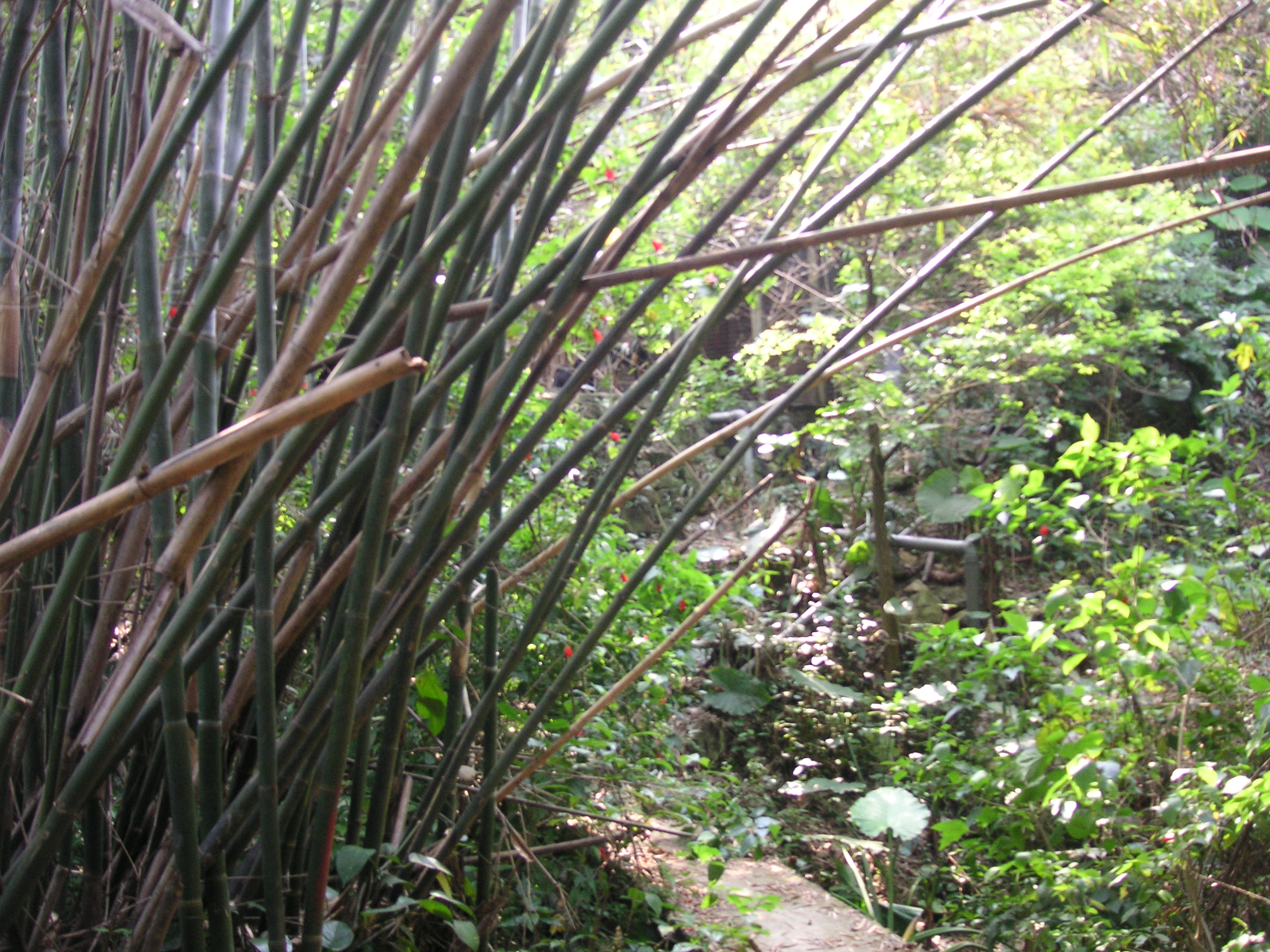
Covered village houses and a stream behind bamboo forest in Sai Shan in March 2006

Sai Shan Village is a village on Tsing Yi Island, Hong Kong. The village was beneath the valley of Sai Shan and Tsing Yi Peak near Mayfair Gardens and the Hong Kong Institute of Vocational Education (Tsing Yi). A stream runs from the valley was water source for agriculture in the village. Part of the village was demolished to reduce the risk of flooding and align with Hong Kong Government policy on squatters. The land was replaced by a small park. The village is reachable from a trail starting from a bus stop adjacent to Ching Hong Road and Mayfair Gardens. Another trail leading to another valley with graveyards and fields lies high up between the middle peak and northern peak of Tsing Yi Peak.
