= San Uk Tsuen (Tsing Yi) =

Coordinates: 22.353395°N 114.100715°E

San Uk Tsuen (Chinese: 新屋村) or San Uk Resite Village (Chinese: 新屋新村) is a village on Tsing Yi island, in Kwai Tsing District, Hong Kong.

== Administration ==
San Uk is a recognized village under the New Territories Small House Policy. It is one of the villages represented within the Tsing Yi Rural Committee.

== See also ==
- Lam Tin Resite Village
- Tai Wong Ha Tsuen
- Yim Tin Kok Tsuen
