= Yim Tin Kok Tsuen =

Village in Hong Kong

Coordinates: 22.352916°N 114.100369°E

Yim Tin Kok Tsuen (Chinese: 鹽田角村) or Yim Tin Kok Resite Village (鹽田角新村) is a village on Tsing Yi island, in Kwai Tsing District, Hong Kong.

== Administration ==
Yim Tin Kok is a recognized village under the New Territories Small House Policy. It is one of the villages represented within the Tsing Yi Rural Committee.

== See also ==
- Lam Tin Resite Village
- San Uk Tsuen (Tsing Yi)
- Tai Wong Ha Tsuen
