= Tsing Yi Lutheran Village =

Village in Hong Kong

Coordinates: 22.352006°N 114.106388°E

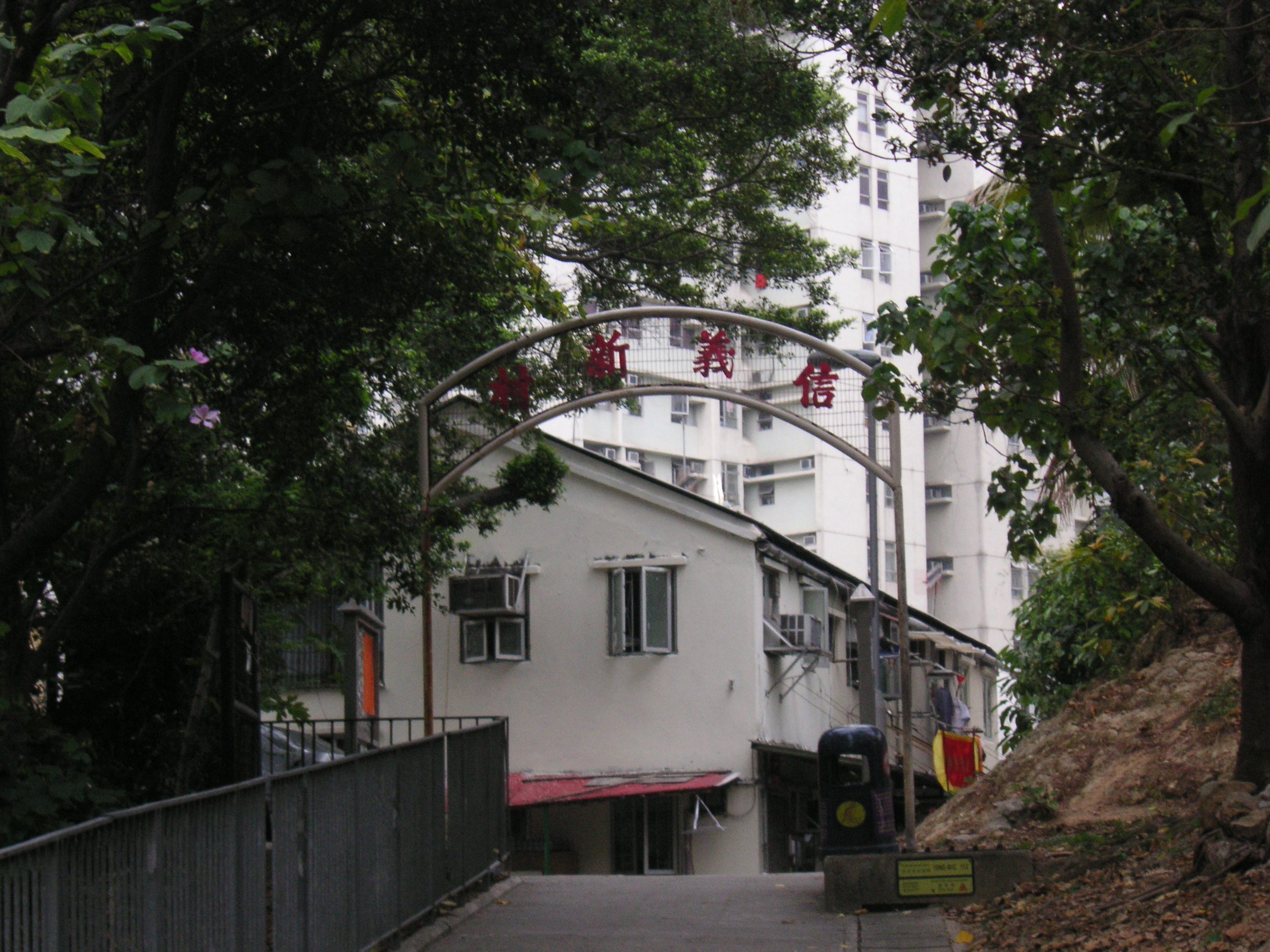
Tsing Yi Lutheran Village

Tsing Yi Lutheran Village (Chinese: 信義新村), also referred to as Tsing Yi Lutheran New Village, is a village on Tsing Yi Island. It is located near Chung Mei Village.

== Temples ==
There are several temples that were moved together with former resident in Tsing Yi Town.

- Tsing Tak Tong Tat-more Temple (清德堂達摩廟); a Bodhidharma temple.
- Tai Yam Neong Neong Temple (太陰娘娘廟); a Taoist temple, worshipping the Goddess of Moon, Tai Yin Niang Niang (太陰娘娘).
- Tai Wong Temple (大王古廟), a Taoist temple.
