= Lam Tin Resite Village =

Village in Hong Kong

Coordinates: 22.35181°N 114.100515°E

Lam Tin Resite Village (Chinese: 藍田新村) or Lam Tin Tsuen (藍田村) is a village on Tsing Yi island, in Kwai Tsing District, Hong Kong.

== Administration ==
Lam Tin Tsuen is a recognized village under the New Territories Small House Policy. It is one of the villages represented within the Tsing Yi Rural Committee.

== See also ==
- San Uk Tsuen (Tsing Yi)
- Tai Wong Ha Tsuen
- Yim Tin Kok Tsuen
