= Tai Wong Ha Tsuen =

Village in Hong Kong

Coordinates: 22.353901°N 114.101128°E

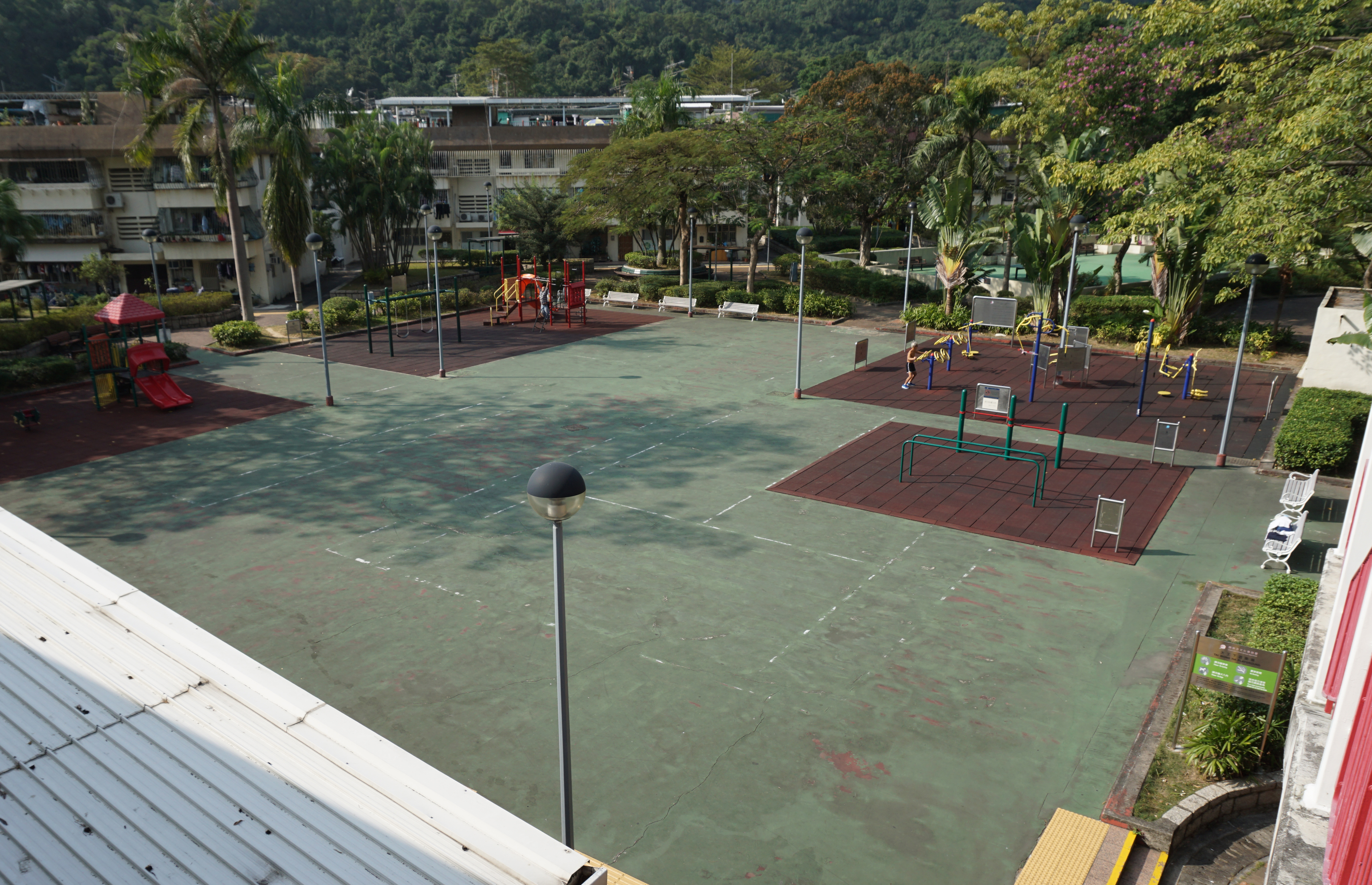
Tai Wong Ha Playground, with Tai Wong Ha Resite Village in the background

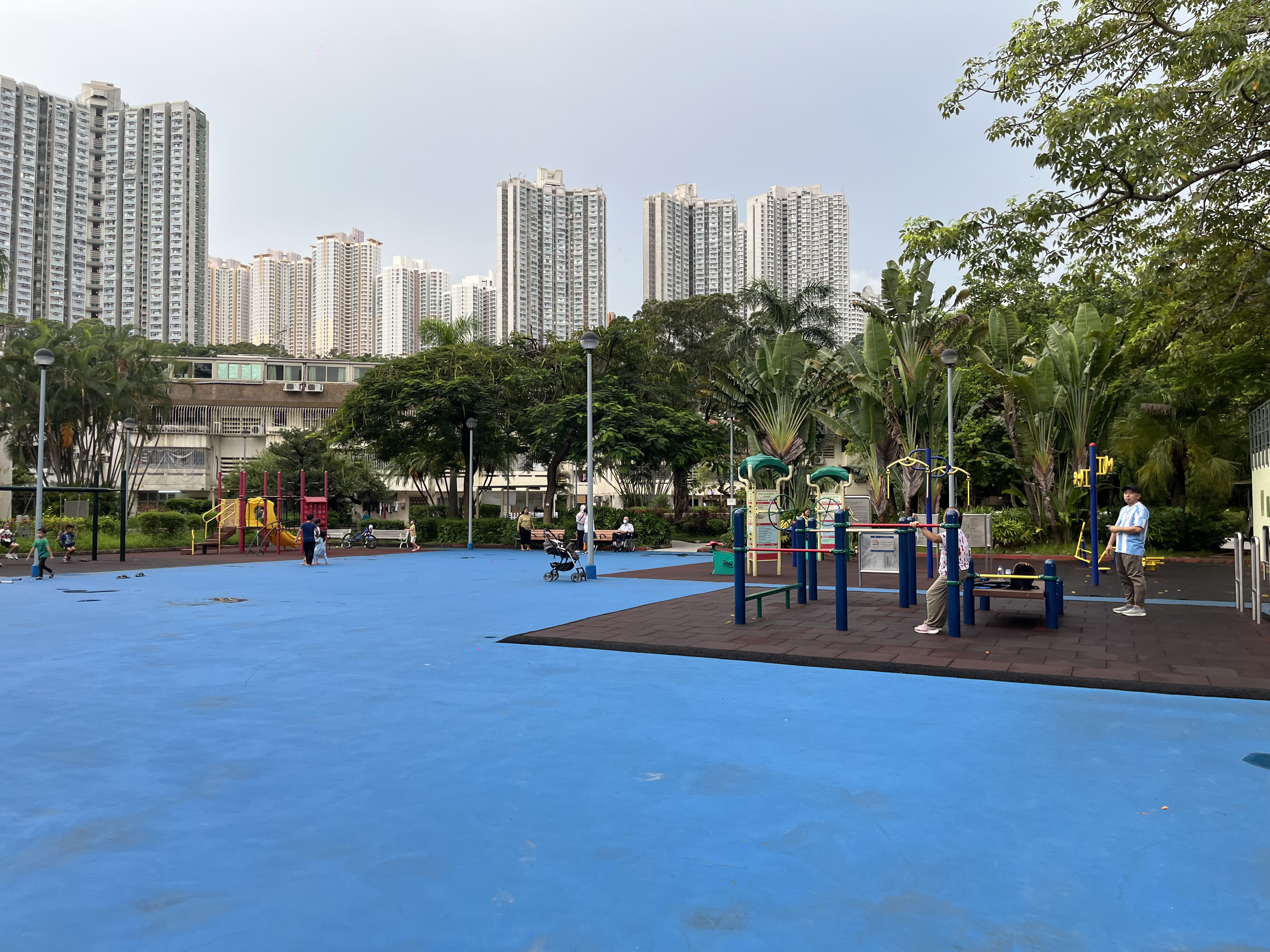
Tai Wong Ha Playground, with Tai Wong Ha Resite Village in the background

Tai Wong Ha Tsuen (Chinese: 大王下村) or Tai Wong Ha Resite Village (大王下新村) is a village on Tsing Yi island, in Kwai Tsing District, Hong Kong.

== Administration ==
Tai Wong Ha is a recognized village under the New Territories Small House Policy. It is one of the villages represented within the Tsing Yi Rural Committee.

== See also ==
- Lam Tin Resite Village
- San Uk Tsuen (Tsing Yi)
- Yim Tin Kok Tsuen
