= Tsing Yi Peak =

Hill on Tsing Yi Island, Hong Kong

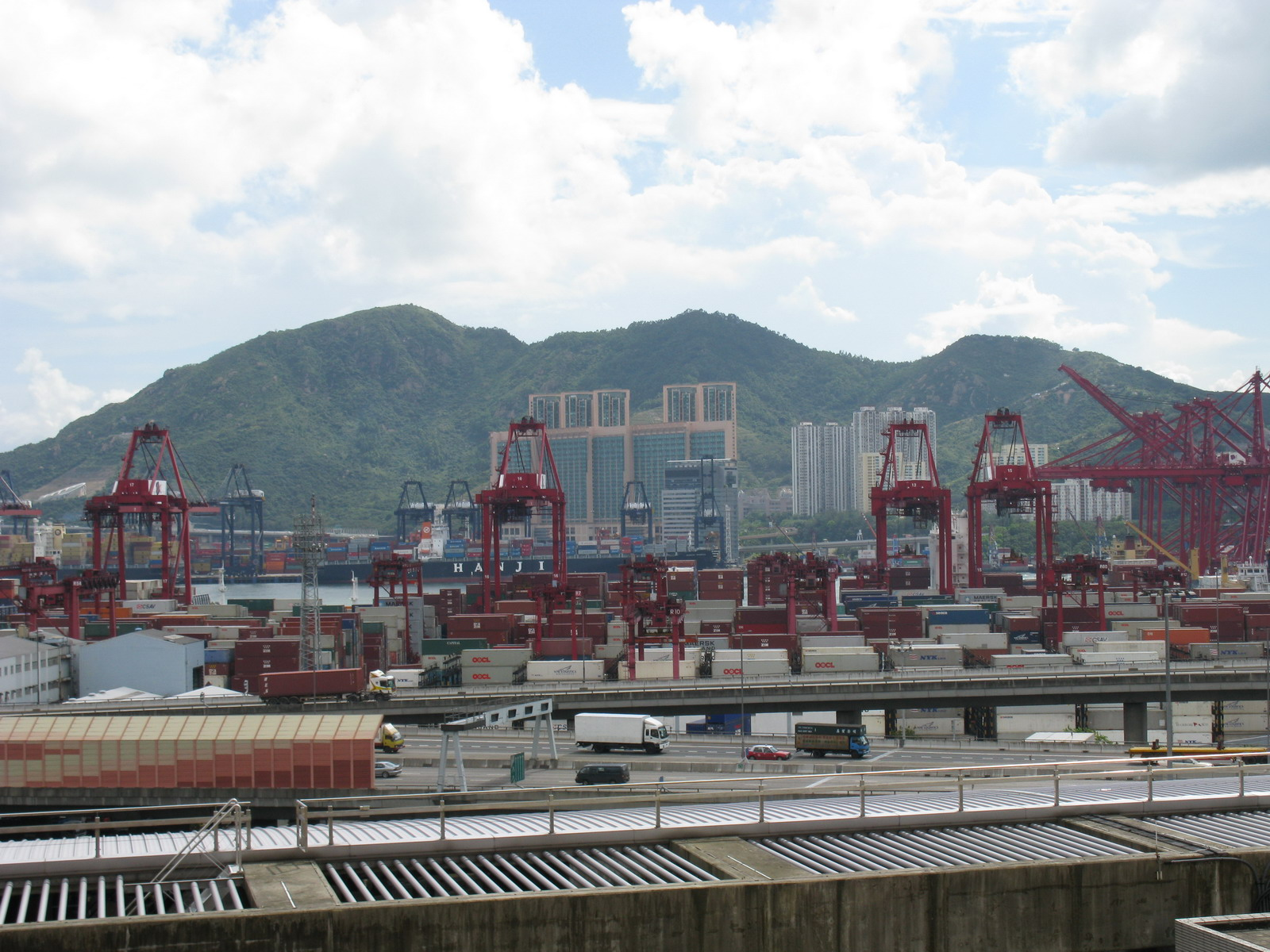
- Three peaks of Tsing Yi Peak, view from Kwai Chung side

Highest point
- Elevation: 334 m (1,096 ft)
- Coordinates: 22°20′14.1″N 114°6′0.61″E

Geography
- Location within Hong Kong
- Location: Hong Kong

Tsing Yi Peak
- Chinese: 青衣山
Transcriptions
Standard Mandarin
- Hanyu Pinyin: Qīngyī shān
Yue: Cantonese
- Yale Romanization: Chīngyī sāan
- Jyutping: Cing^{1}ji^{1} saan^{1}

Sam Chi Heung
- Chinese: 三支香
- Literal meaning: three joss sticks
Transcriptions
Standard Mandarin
- Hanyu Pinyin: sān zhī xiāng
Yue: Cantonese
- Yale Romanization: sāam jī hēung
- Jyutping: saam^{1} zi^{1} hoeng^{1}

Tsing Yi Peak (Chinese: 青衣山; formerly spelled Tsing I Peak), also known as Sam Chi Heung (三支香; lit. 'three joss sticks'), is a hill with three peaks occupying the southern half of the Tsing Yi Island, Hong Kong. The hill is situated on the western half of Victoria Harbour. Its peaks are good locations to observe the harbour and the channels among harbour islands. While situated in the south, a short hill Liu To Shan occupies the northwest of the island.

The three peaks align along north and south, and their heights increase from north to south. The highest south peak is of 334 metres (1,096 ft). A paved trail links the three peaks.

Two tunnels run beneath the hill. Cheung Tsing Tunnel goes through the north peak while Nam Wan Tunnel through the three peaks diagonally. There is no vehicle access to the peaks.

Most of the petroleum oil depots in Hong Kong are located on the south and west industrial area of the Tsing Yi Island. Tsing Yi Peak is a natural barrier protecting 200 thousand residents in the island's north and east.

== North peak ==
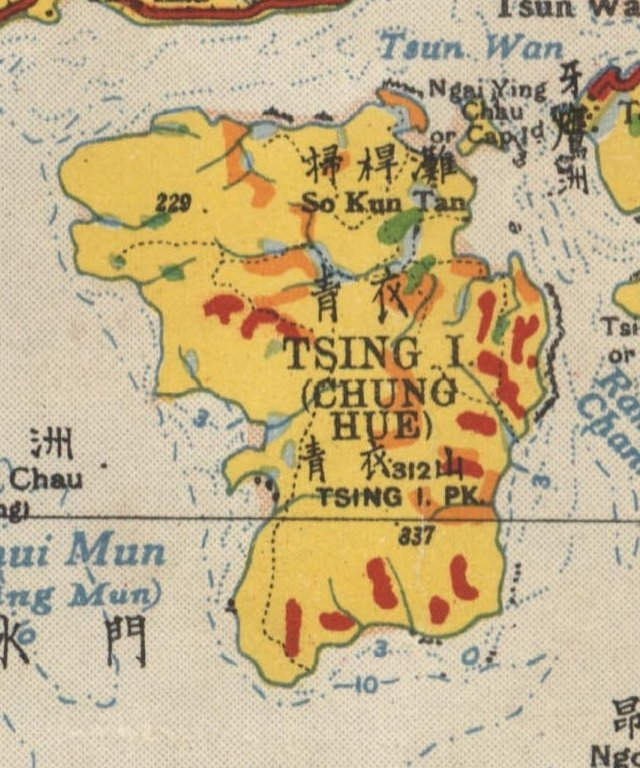
The position of Tsing Yi Peak (TSING I. PK.) on the southern Tsing Yi Island (TSING I.) (in 1936)

The foot of the north peak consists of the main burial ground for indigenous inhabitants of Tsing Yi Island. The burial ground occupies the north-east quadrant of the peak. A covered service reservoir with two football pitches are also situated near the residential area, Cheung Ching Estate and Cheung Hong Estate. The paved trail starting near the Cheung Ching Bus Terminus makes its way to the peak via football pitch and burial ground. Alternative paved trail to the peak starts from Mayfair Gardens near a bus stop at Ching Hong Road.

On the north peak erects a pavilion and a trigonometrical station. Most of the new town of Tsing Yi, Tsuen Wan and Kwai Chung, and the Rambler Channel is under its north and east while Ma Wan Channel, Tsing Ma Bridge, Liu To Shan and northeast Lantau Island under its west.

The paved trail continues south to meet the middle peak.

== Middle peak ==
The middle peak is more cone-shaped than the other two. Great stones of various shapes gather at the highest points. An obstacle light was built by Civil Aviation Department near the stones. The middle peak is assigned as Hill No. 6 on the signboard of the light.

The middle peak is reachable by the paved trail or a less obvious path from Hong Kong Institute of Vocational Education (Tsing Yi). This path with paved ladders goes uphill along the valley between the north and middle peak. Agricultural fields are found in mid-level by a stream. The path become less obvious afterward. The burial ground of Chan's family helps to identify the way up to the above-mentioned paved trail.

== South peak ==
The south peak is the highest among three peaks. The top of the peak is relatively flat. A trigonometrical station is highest point on the Tsing Yi Island. Like the middle peak, an obstacle light was established to help aeroplanes avoiding the peaks at night. The peak is assigned as Hill No. 5 on its signboard.

The southeast slope near the top was found the Hong Kong Croton and is now Site of Special Scientific Interest to protect the species.

The south peak is a good situation to observe the south end of the Tsing Yi Island, Rambler Channel and Victoria Harbour. In a clear day, its south is surrounded by waters hugged by Kowloon Peninsula, Stonecutters Island, Hong Kong Island, Green Island, Kau Yi Chau, Peng Chau, Lantau Island, Tang Lung Chau and Ma Wan. Nearly a hundred ships are staying on the water. The Container Terminal 9 of Kwai Tsing Container Terminals is on its near shore and all others on another shore of Rambler Channel.

Apart from the paved trail leading from the middle peak, the south peak is also reachable from the direction of Ng Tsang Lau.

== See also ==
- List of mountains, peaks and hills in Hong Kong
