= Public housing estates in Kwai Chung =

Public housing in Kwai Chung, Hong Kong

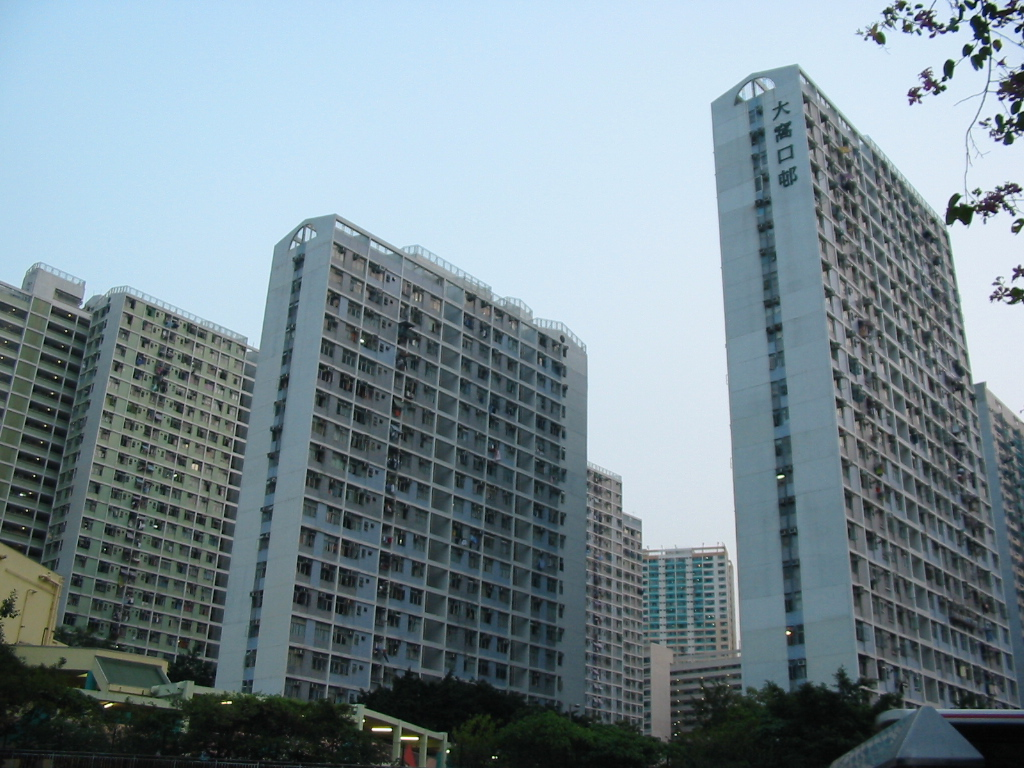
Tai Wo Hau Estate (linear blocks)

The following is an overview of Public housing estates in Kwai Chung, Hong Kong, including Home Ownership Scheme (HOS), Private Sector Participation Scheme (PSPS), Sandwich Class Housing Scheme (SCHS), Flat-for-Sale Scheme (FFSS), and Tenants Purchase Scheme (TPS) estates.

== Overview ==
Name		Type	Inaug.	No Blocks	No Units	Notes
Cho Yiu Chuen	祖堯邨	Public	1976	8	2,532	HK Housing Society
Hibiscus Park	芊紅居	Sandwich	1998	2	420	HK Housing Society
Highland Park	浩景臺	Sandwich	1999	6	1,456	HK Housing Society
High Prosperity Terrace	高盛臺	Public	2003	2	760	
Kwai Chun Court	葵俊苑	HOS	1995	3	1,050	
Kwai Chung Estate	葵涌邨	Public	1997	14	11,759	
Kwai Fong Estate	葵芳邨	Public	1987	12	6,449	
Kwai Hing Estate	葵興邨	TPS	1991	4	383*	* PRH flats only (excluding TPS)
Kwai Hong Court	葵康苑	HOS	1993	2	701	
Kwai Luen Estate	葵聯邨	Public	2011	2	1,507	+ two blocks under construction
Kwai Shing East Estate	葵盛東邨	Public	1989	12	7,108	
Kwai Shing West Estate	葵盛西邨	Public	1975	10	5,261	
Kwai Tsui Estate	葵翠邨	Public	2018	2	866	
Kwai Yin Court	葵賢苑	HOS	1993	2	700	
Lai King Estate	荔景邨	Public	1975	7	4,224	
Lai Yan Court	荔欣苑	HOS	2001	2	1,920	
Lai Yiu Estate	麗瑤邨	Public	1976	5	2,841	
On Yam Estate	安蔭邨	Public	1994	8	5,492	
Ning Fung Court	寧峰苑	HOS	2001	4	1,280	
Shek Lei (I) Estate	石籬(一)邨	Public	1985	9	4,989	
Shek Lei (II) Estate	石籬(二)邨	Public	1994	9	5,597	
Shek Yam East Estate	石蔭東邨	Public	1996	3	2,331	
Shek Yam Estate	石蔭邨	Public	2000	3	2,331	
Sheung Man Court	尚文苑	HOS	2020	1	494	
Tai Wo Hau Estate	大窩口邨	Public	1979	17	7,860	
Tsui Yiu Court	翠瑤苑	HOS	1981	1	292	
Wah Lai Estate	華荔邨	Public	2001	2	1,517	
Yi Fung Court	怡峰苑	HOS	1999	2	700	
Yin Lai Court	賢麗苑	HOS	1991	2	560	
Yuet Lai Court	悅麗苑	HOS	1981	4	704	

== Estates ==
=== Cho Yiu Chuen ===
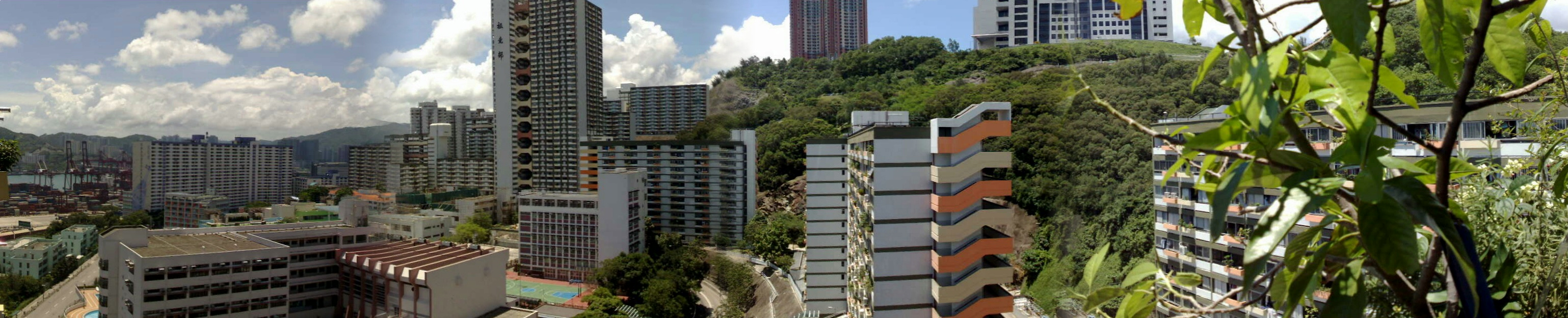
Overview of Cho Yiu Chuen

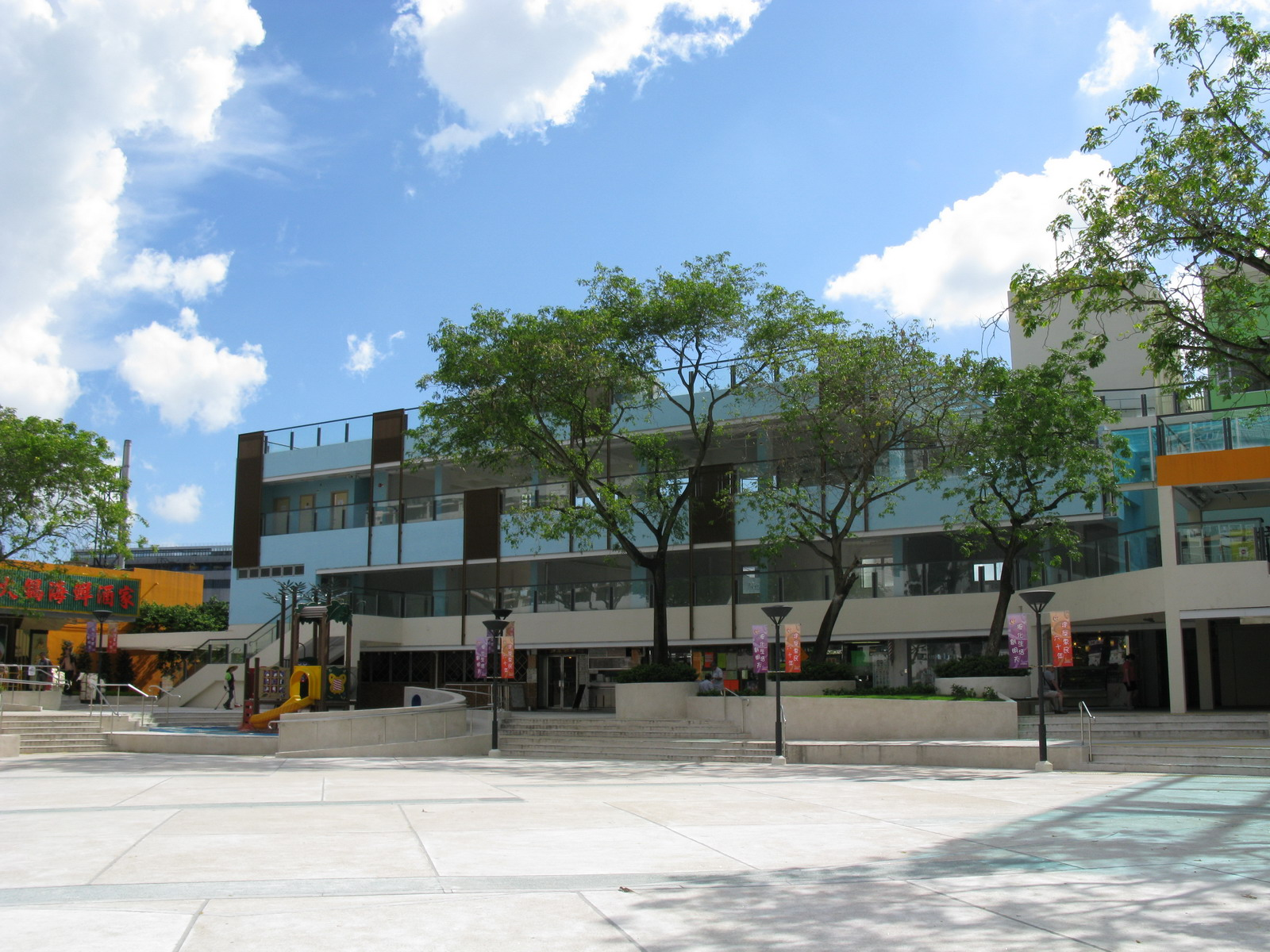
Cho Yiu Place, a redecorated shopping centre of Cho Yiu Chuen

Cho Yiu Chuen (Chinese: 祖堯邨) consists of 8 residential buildings with a total of 2,532 units, which were built in 1977, 1978 and 1981. It also provides elderly persons flats at Chung Ling Sheh (Chinese: 松齡舍). It was named for Sir Cho Yiu Kwan (Chinese: 關祖堯爵士), one of the founders of Hong Kong Housing Society. It received a Certificate of Merit at the 1981 Hong Kong Institute of Architects Annual Awards.

Name	Completion
Kai Chun Lau	1977
Kai Kwong Lau	1977
Kai Lim Lau	1977
Kai Him Lau	1978–1979
Kai Hang Lau	1978–1979
Kai Min Lau	1978–1979
Chung Ling Sheh	1978–1979
Kai King Lau	1981

Kai King Lau is the tallest building in Cho Yiu Chuen with 38 storeys. It was also the tallest public housing building in the world at that time.

=== Hibiscus Park ===
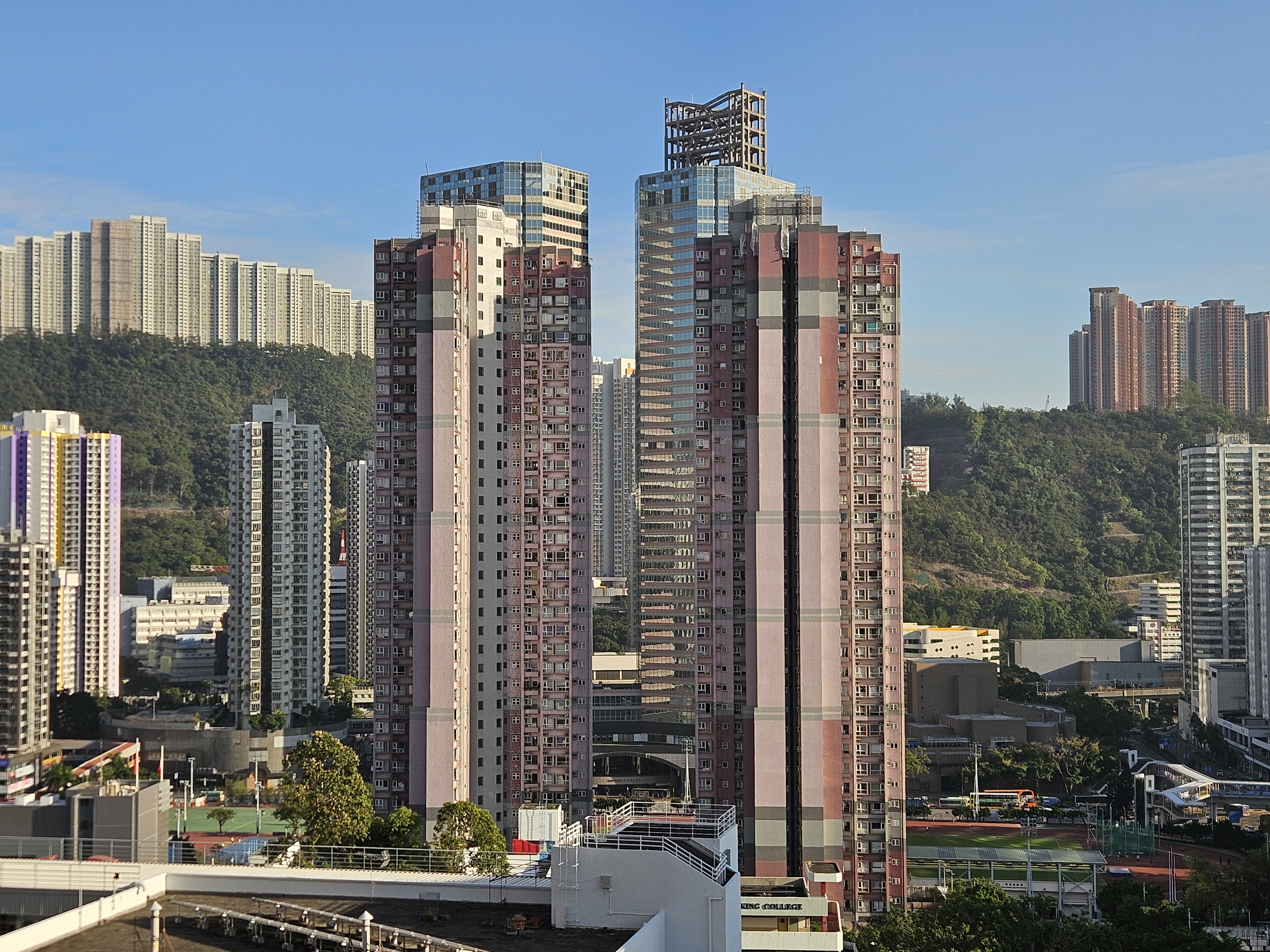
Hibiscus Park

Hibiscus Park (Chinese: 芊紅居) is a SCHS estate in Kwai Chung, near Kwai Chung Sports Ground, Kwai Fong. Formerly the site of Kwai Hong Temporary Housing Area (Chinese: 葵康臨時房屋區), it consists of 2 blocks built in 1998.

=== Highland Park ===
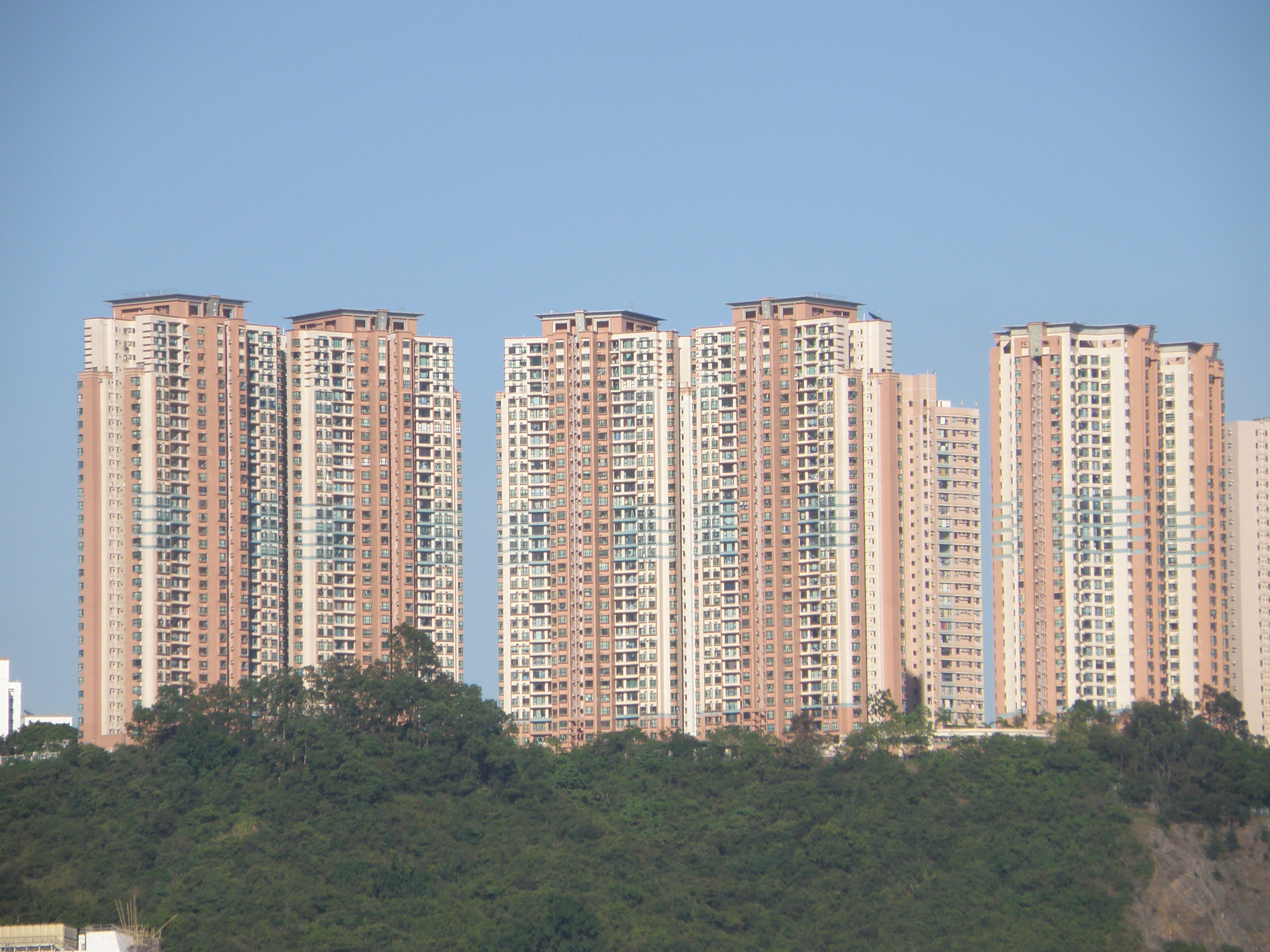
Highland Park

Highland Park (Chinese: 浩景臺) is a SCHS estate, developed by the HKHS and situated at the mid-level of Lai King Hill, Kwai Chung. Formerly the site of Lai King Temporary Housing Area (Chinese: 荔景臨時房屋區), It has totally 6 blocks built in 1999, offering 1,456 flats.

=== High Prosperity Terrace ===
High Prosperity Terrace (Chinese: 高盛臺) was PSPS estate which was jointly by the Hong Kong Housing Authority and Supertime Holdings. However, it was transferred to rental public housing estate in 2002. Its rent are now fixed at 10% above the best rents of the district concerned in view of their higher standard of finishes and fittings. It has two residential buildings, completed in 2003. Formerly the site of Kwai Lok Temporary Housing Area (Chinese: 葵樂臨時房屋區),

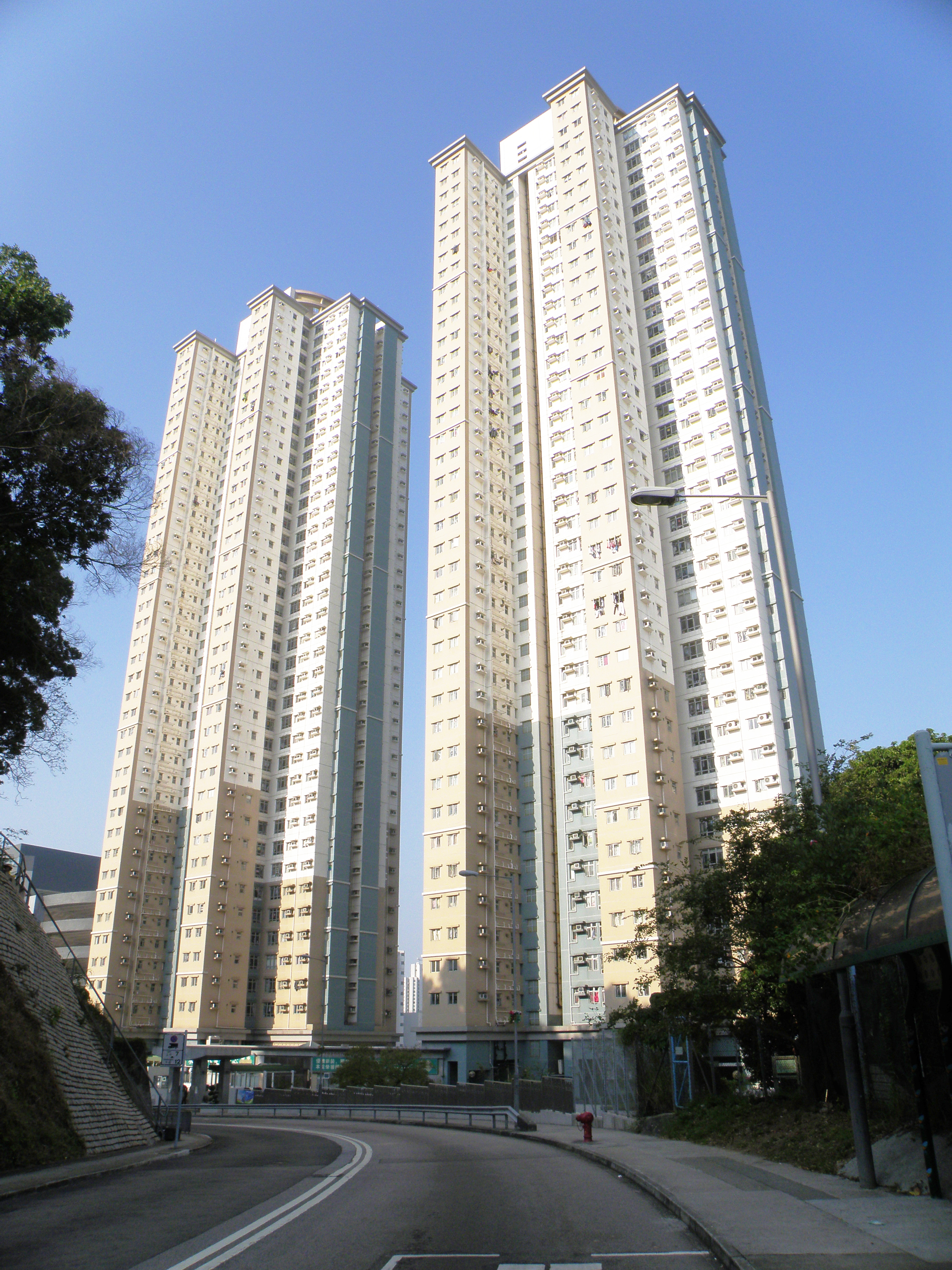
High Prosperity Terrace

=== Kwai Chun Court ===
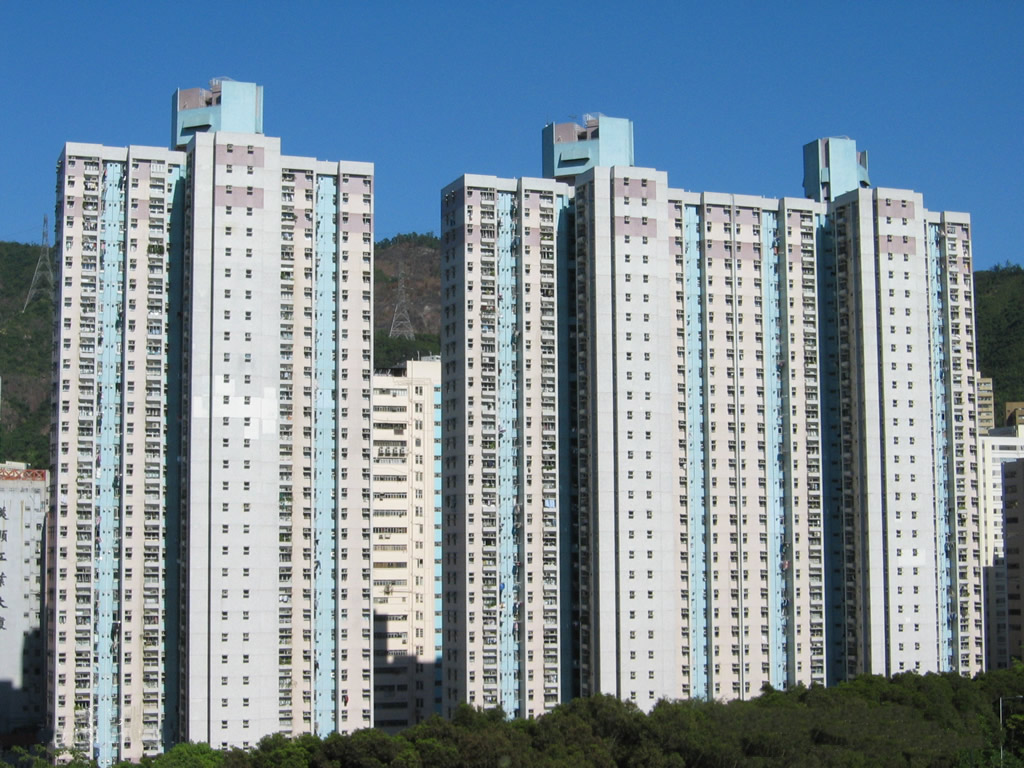
Kwai Chun Court

Kwai Chun Court (Chinese: 葵俊苑) is a HOS court in Kwai Chung, near Kwai Hing Estate. It has 3 blocks built in 1995.

Name	Type	Completion
Kwai Cheong House	NCB (Ver.1984)	1995
Kwai Yue House	NCB (Ver.1984)	1995
Kwai Fung House	NCB (Ver.1984)	1995

=== Kwai Chung Estate ===
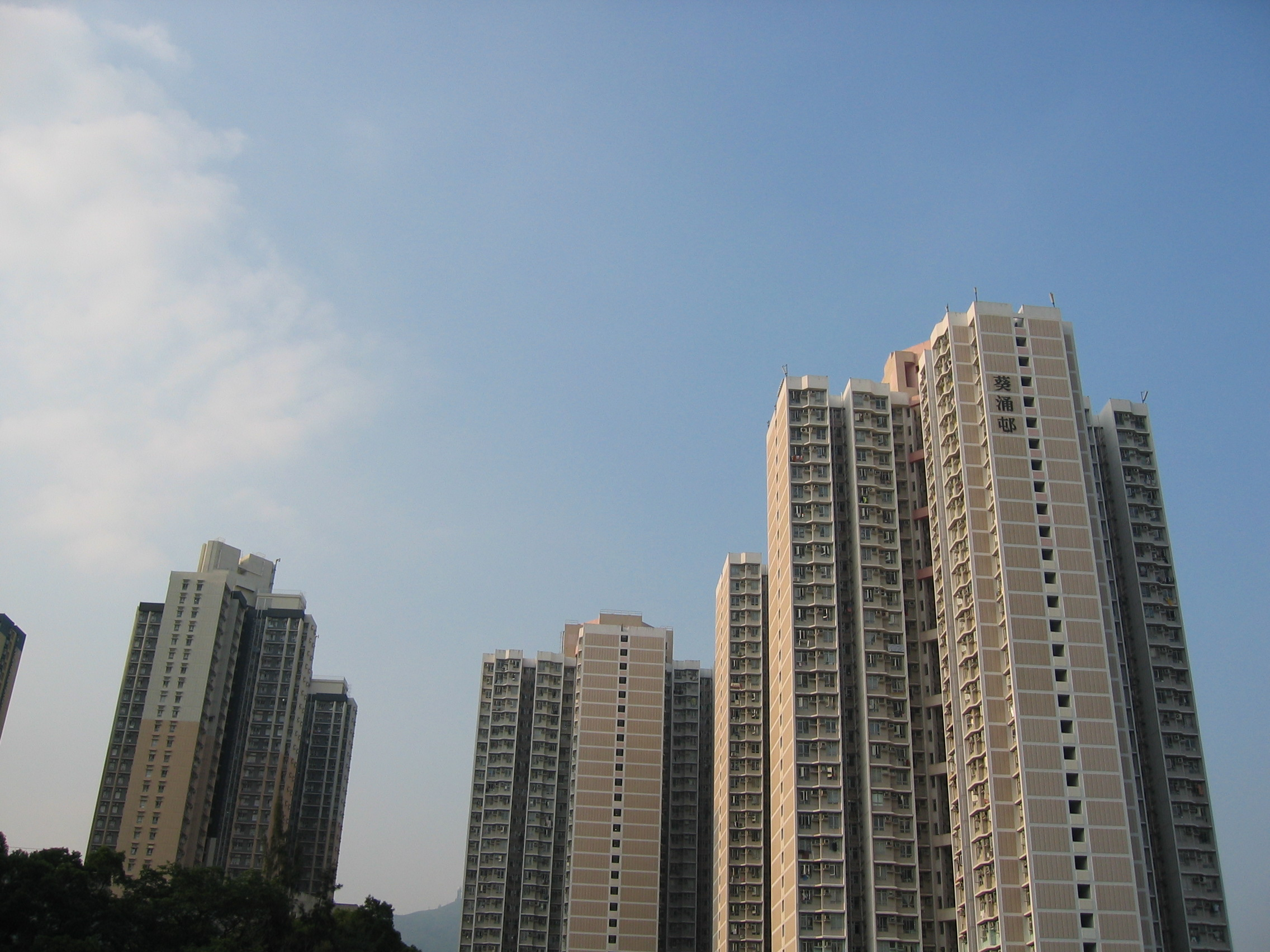
Kwai Chung Estate, Phase 1 Redevelopment

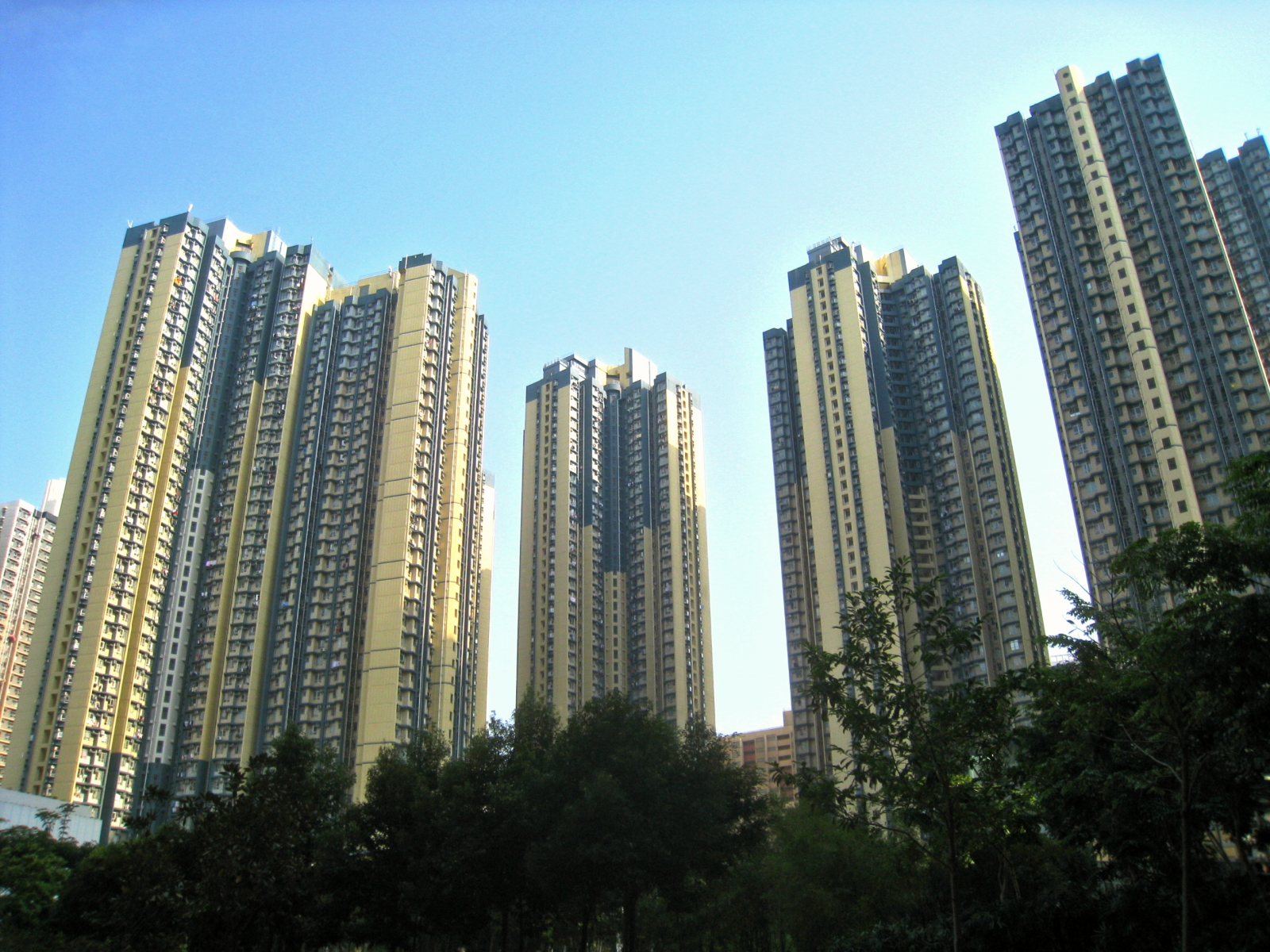
Kwai Chung Estate, Phase 3 Redevelopment

Kwai Chung Estate (Chinese: 葵涌邨) is now under the management of the Hong Kong Housing Authority (HKHA). The phase 1 and phase 3–5 of its redevelopment were completed progressively in 1998, 2000 and 2005. Starting from 1993, the Housing Department has embarked on the redevelopment of Kwai Chung Estate. After 12 years of work, the entire redevelopment project was realised in 2005. Being the largest public housing estate in Hong Kong, Kwai Chung Estate provides 11,759 rental flats for about 33,300 people. The redevelopment works also include realignment of Sheung Kok Street, road improvement works and the allocation of 800 flats in Kwai Fuk Court for government quarters. It features commercial centre, carpark, public transport interchange, post office, social welfare and recreational facilities. Pak Kwai House and Hop Kwai House were built of the site of the former Kwai Chung Factory Estate.

House name	Type	Completion
Chun Kwai House (春葵樓)	Harmony 1	1997
Ha Kwai House (夏葵樓)	Harmony 1	1997
Chau Kwai House (秋葵樓)	Harmony 1	1997
Yan Kwai House (茵葵樓)	Single Aspect Building	2000
Pik Kwai House (碧葵樓)	New Harmony 1	2005
Chui Kwai House (翠葵樓)	New Harmony 1	2005
Chin Kwai House (芊葵樓)	New Harmony 1	2005
Nga Kwai House (雅葵樓)	New Harmony 1	2005
Yuk Kwai House (旭葵樓)	New Harmony 1	2005
Ying Kwai House (映葵樓)	New Harmony 1	2005
Hiu Kwai House (曉葵樓)	New Harmony 1	2005
Luk Kwai House (綠葵樓)	New Harmony 1	2005
Tsz Kwai House (芷葵樓)	New Harmony 1	2005
Yat Kwai House (逸葵樓)	New Harmony 1	2005
Pak Kwai House (百葵樓)	New Harmony 1	2008
Hop Kwai House (合葵樓)	New Harmony 1	2008

=== Kwai Fong Estate ===
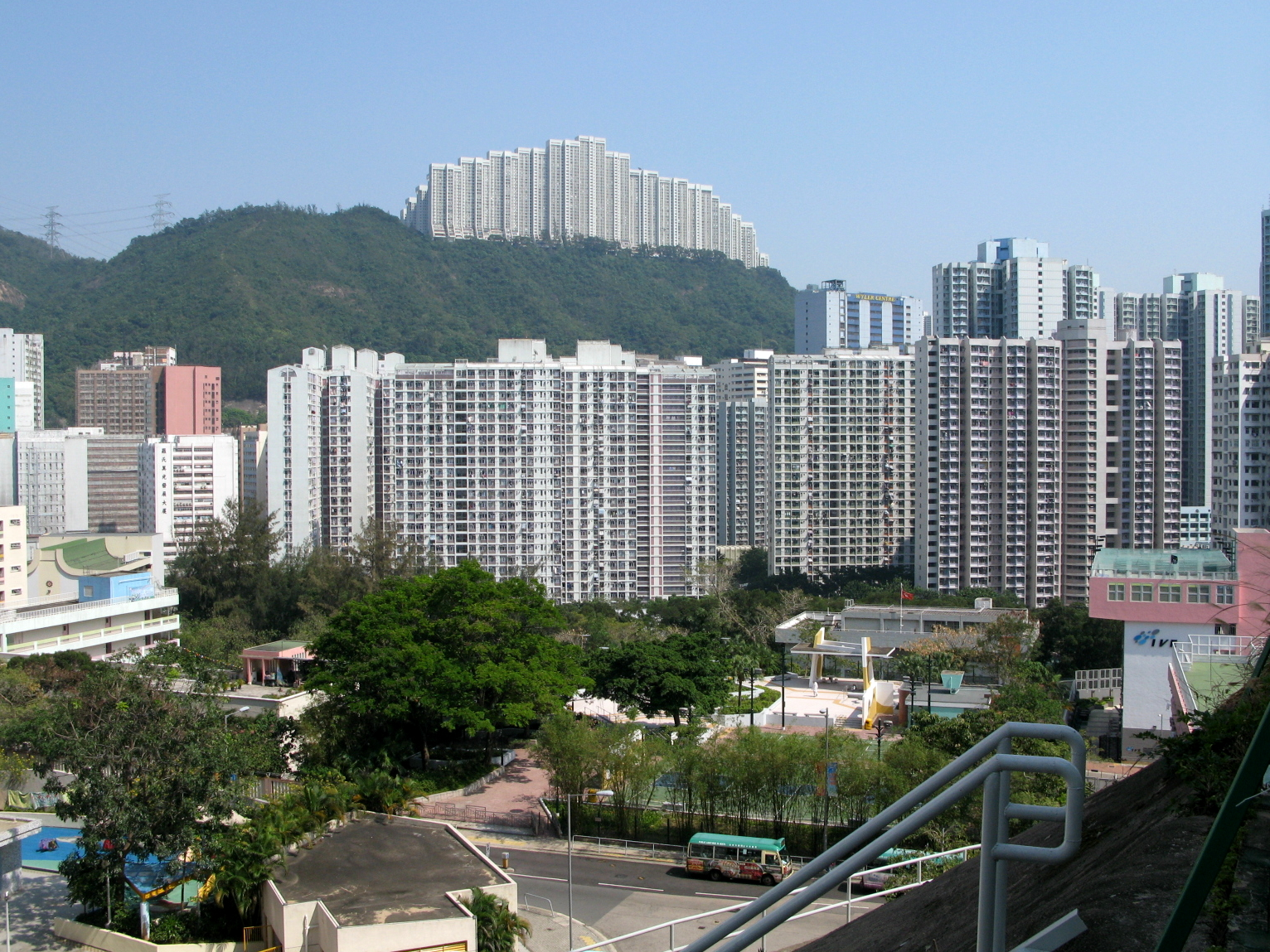
Kwai Fong Estate

Kwai Fong Estate (Chinese: 葵芳邨) is built on the reclaimed land of Gin Drinkers Bay, later the town centre of Kwai Chung, and the south of Kwai Hing Estate. Kwai Fong station is named from the name of the estate. It comprises 12 buildings with a total of 6400 units and 1 shopping arcade. Before redevelopment, it consisted of 11 buildings which were completed between 1971 and 1973. In 1982, the buildings were revealed to have structural defects. In 1985, the HKHA announced that the strength of the concrete in blocks 8, 9, 10 and 11 of Kwai Fong Estate was below standard. Those blocks were demolished between 1985 and 1989. Other old buildings were also demolished in the 1990s to cope with the estate redevelopment. The estate was later redeveloped with 12 new buildings built between 1987 and 2002.

House name	Type	Completion
Kwai Yan House	New Slab	1987
Kwai Chi House	Linear 1	1987
Kwai Tak House	Linear 1	1991
Kwai Shun House	Linear 3	1991
Kwai On House	Linear 3	1990
Kwai Kin House	Harmony 3	1993
Kwai Ming House	Harmony 1	1996
Kwai Ching House	Harmony 1	1996
Kwai Tai House	Harmony 1	1998
Kwai Oi House	Single Aspect Building	2000
Kwai Foon House	New Cruciform (Ver.1999)	2002
Kwai Hei House	New Cruciform (Ver.1999)	2002

=== Kwai Hing Estate ===
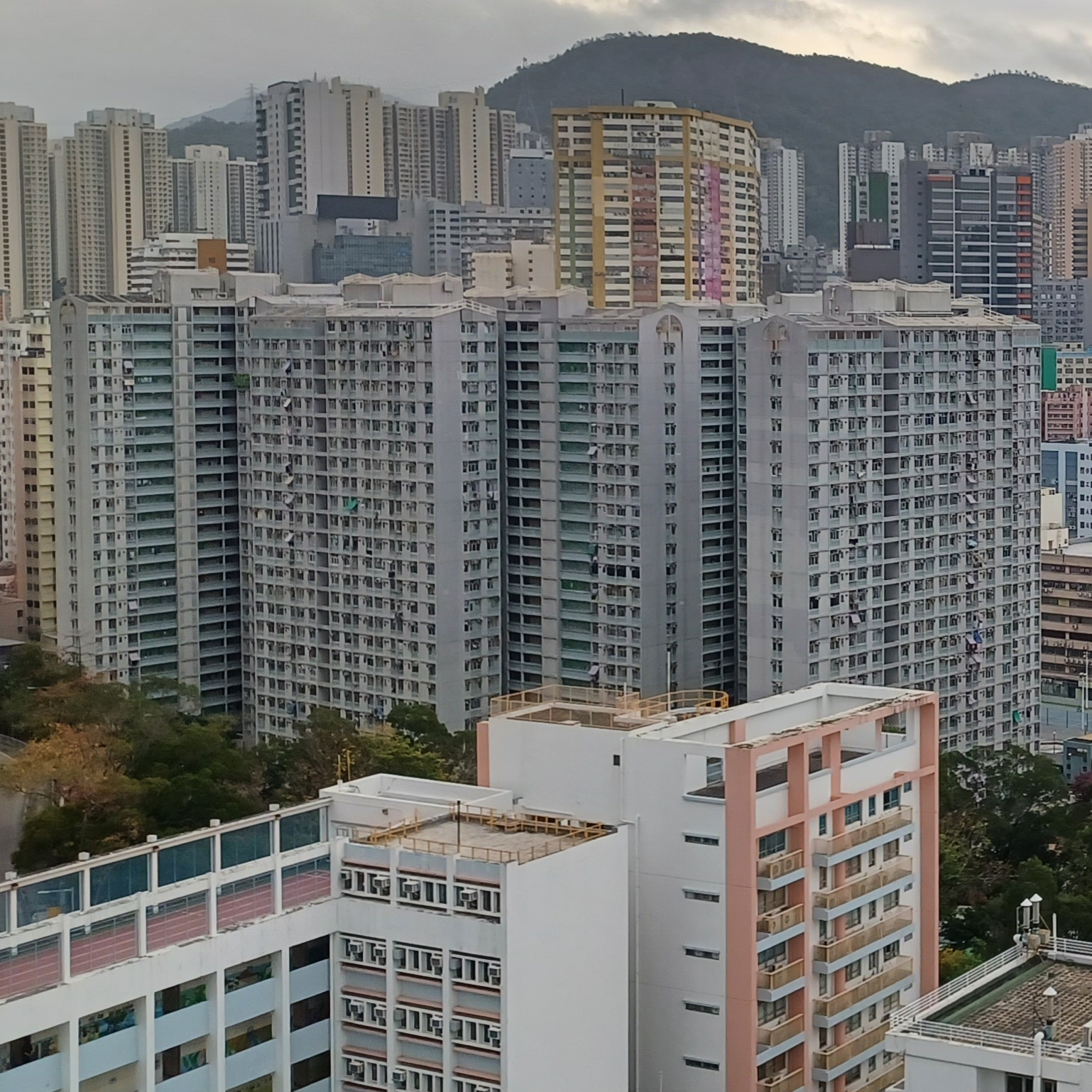
Kwai Hing Estate

Kwai Hing Estate (Chinese: 葵興邨) was built in the valley of Gin Drinkers Bay, later the town centre of Kwai Chung. Kwai Hing station is named after the name of the estate. It comprises 4 buildings with a total of 400 rental units (TPS units excluded) and 1 shopping arcade. Before redevelopment, it consisted of 5 buildings which were completed between 1970 and 1972. In 1985, the HKHA announced that the strength of the concrete in blocks 3, 4 and 5 of Kwai Hing Estate were below standard. All the blocks were later demolished between 1988 and 1992 to cope with the estate redevelopment. The estate was later redeveloped with 5 buildings between 1991 and 1992.

Name	Type	Completion
Hing Kok House	Linear 1	1991
Hing Yat House	Linear 1	1991
Hing Fuk House	Linear 1	1992
Hing Lok House	Linear 1	1992

=== Kwai Hong Court ===
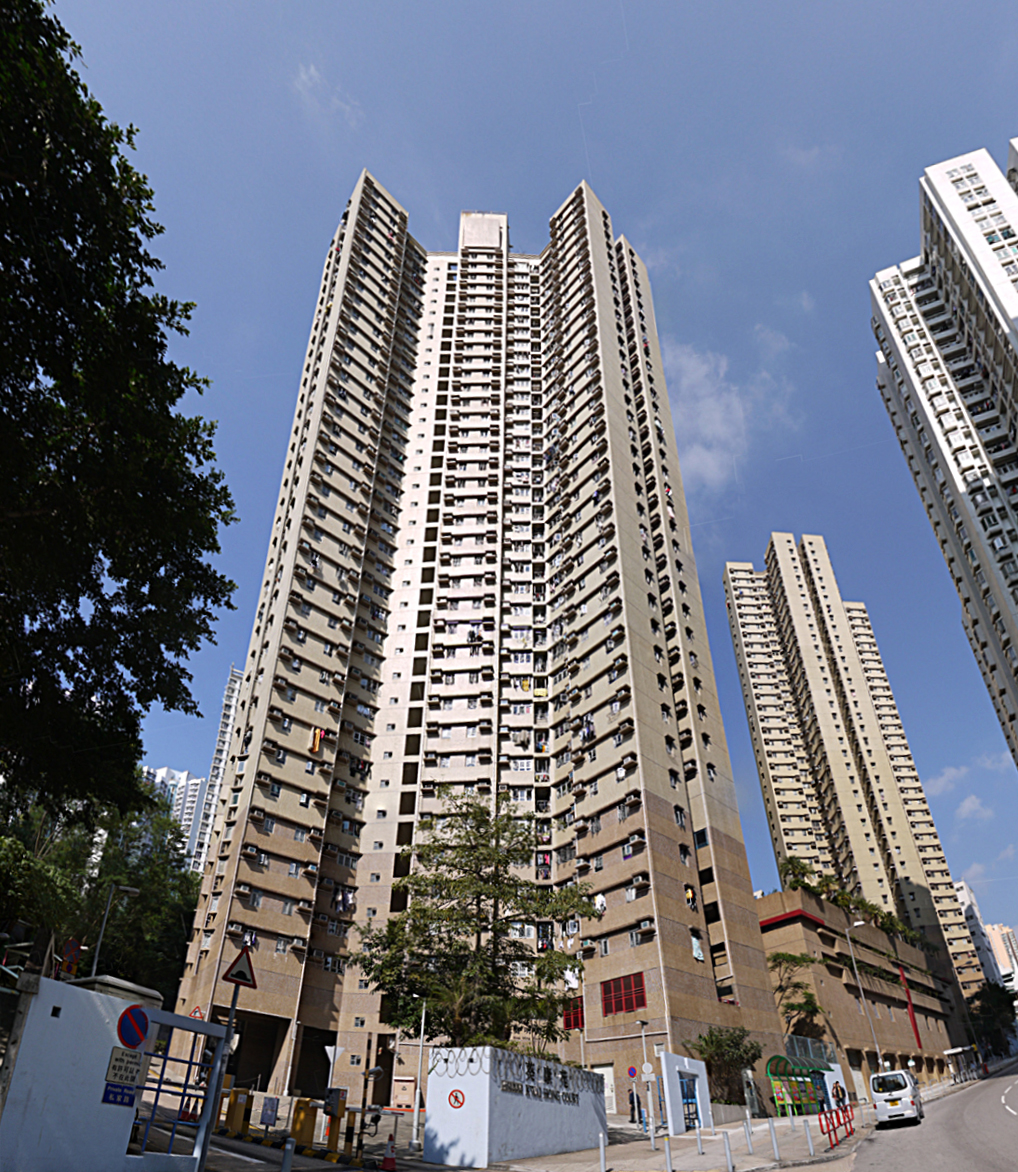
Kwai Hong Court

Kwai Hong Court is a HOS court in Kwai Chung, near Sun Kwai Hing Gardens and Kwai Hing station. It consists of two blocks built in 1993.

Name	Type	Completion
Kwai Ming House	Non-Standard	1993
Kwai Yat House	Non-Standard	1993

=== Kwai Luen Estate ===
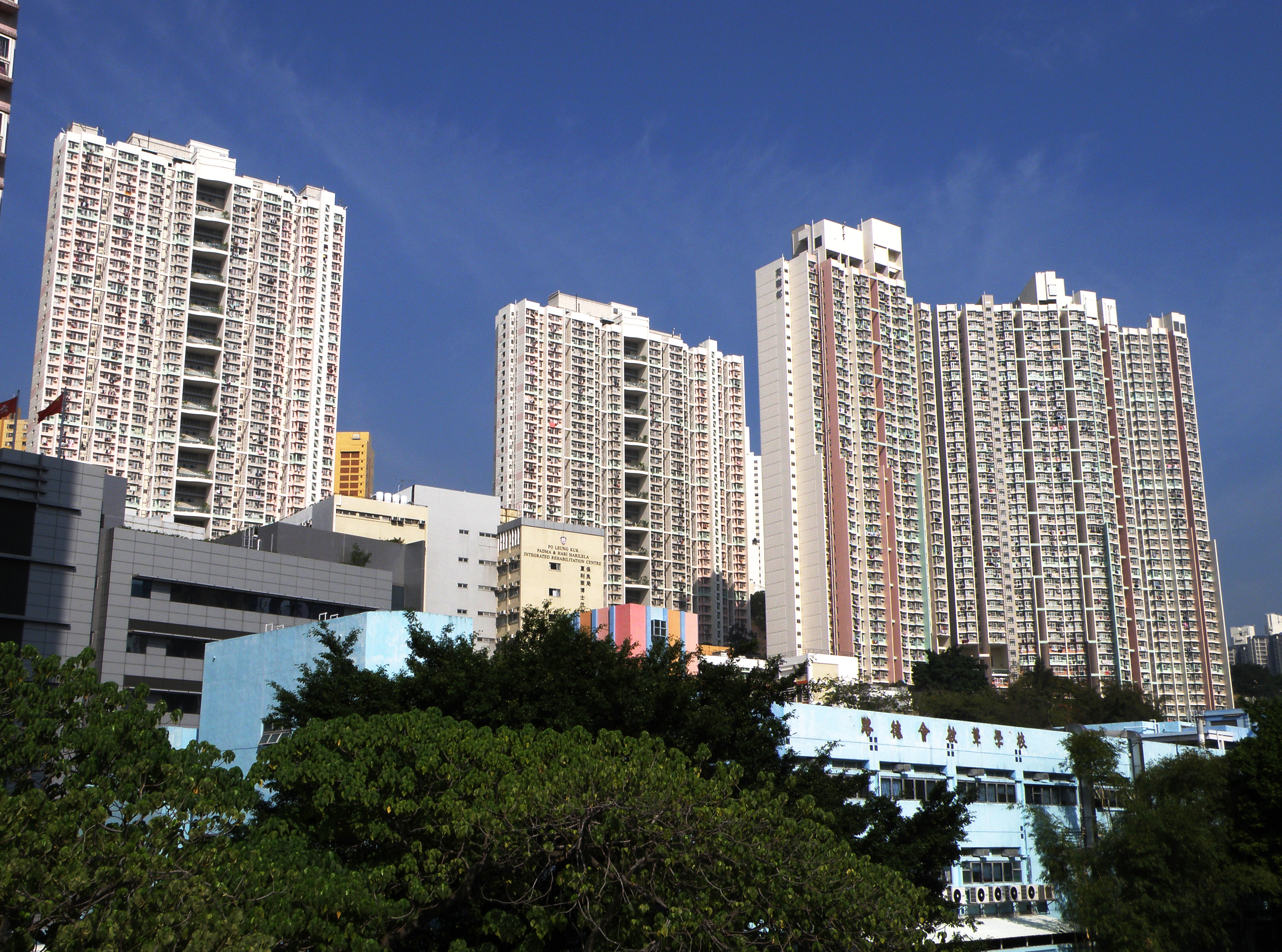
Kwai Luen Estate

Kwai Luen Estate (Chinese: 葵聯邨) opened on Kwai Luen Road in 2011 with two residential blocks. Two additional houses are under construction on Kwai Shing Circuit. It was one of the public housing estates detected to have excessive lead contents in its water supply in 2015.

Name	Type	Completion
Luen Hei House	Non-standard	2011
Luen Yan House	Non-standard	2011
Luen Yat House	Non-standard	2014
Luen Yuet House	Non-standard	2014

=== Kwai Shing East Estate ===
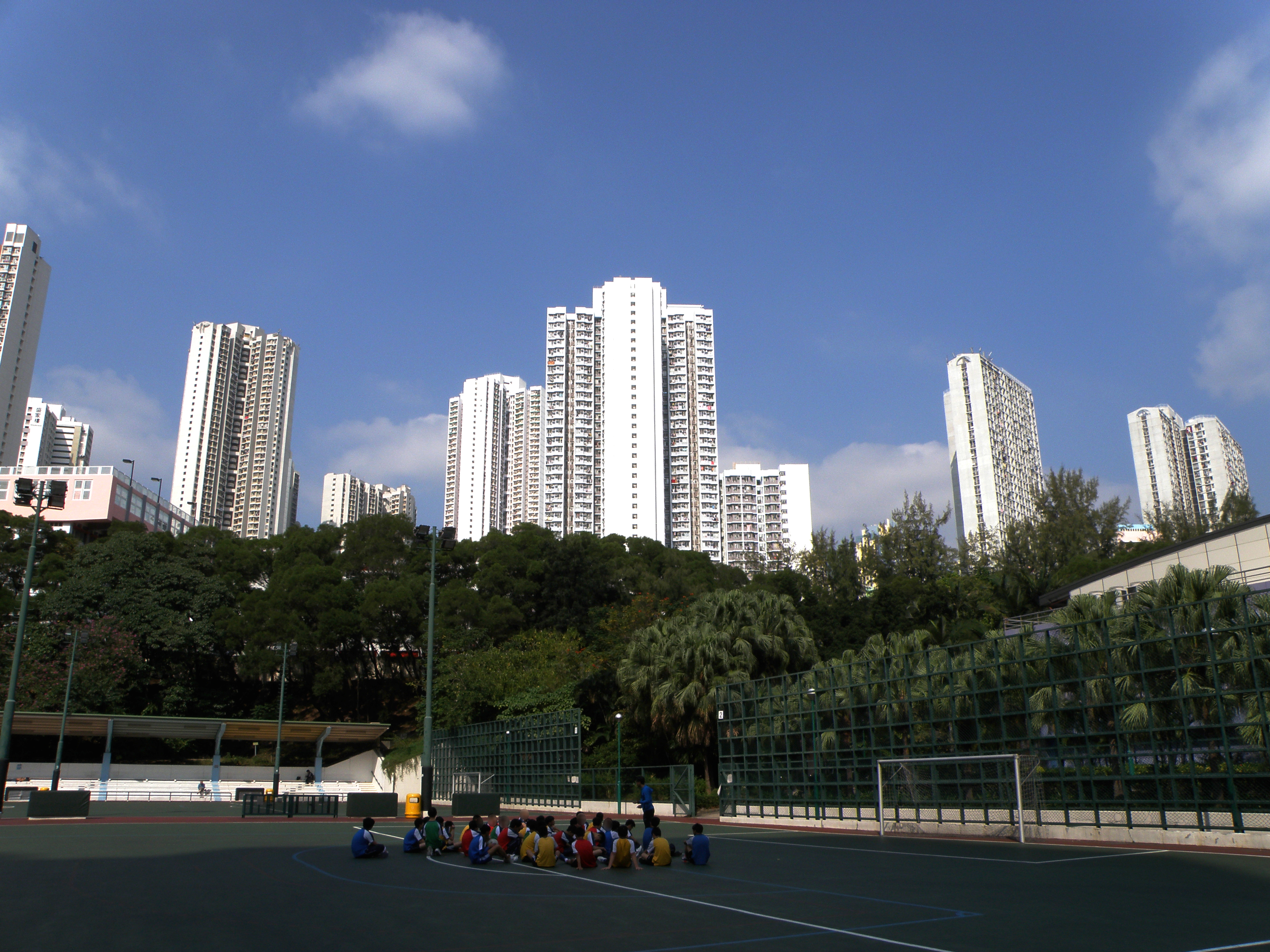
Kwai Shing East Estate

Kwai Shing East Estate (Chinese: 葵盛東邨) is located at the east of Kwai Shing West Estate, and now consists of 12 residential buildings and a shopping centre. Kwai Shing East Estate was formerly Kwai Shing Estate (Chinese: 葵盛邨) which had nine blocks (blocks 12 to 20) completed in 1972 and 1973. In 1977, these blocks were renamed as Kwai Shing East Estate. In 1985, the HKHA announced that the strength of the concrete in Blocks 18 and 20 of the estate were below standard. Those blocks were demolished in 1989. The remaining blocks (except block 12) were demolished and replaced by new buildings in the 1990s and 2000s. In 1995, Block 12 was converted into Interim Housing temporarily to settle people ineligible for public rental housing. But in 2008, the Hong Kong Housing Authority announced plans to demolish block 12 in 2010.

Name	Type	Completion
Block 12	Interim Housing (Old Slab)	1972 (To be demolished in 2010)
Shing Fung House	Linear 1	1990
Shing Hei House	Linear 1	1990
Shing Hing House	Harmony 1	1993
Shing On House	Harmony 3A	1993
Shing Kwok House	Harmony 3A	1997
Shing Lok House	Harmony 1	1998
Shing Fu House	Harmony 1	1998
Shing Keung House	Harmony 1	1999
Shing Yat House	Harmony 1	1999
Shing Ka House	Small Household Block	1999
Shing Wo House	Small Household Block	2003

=== Kwai Shing West Estate ===
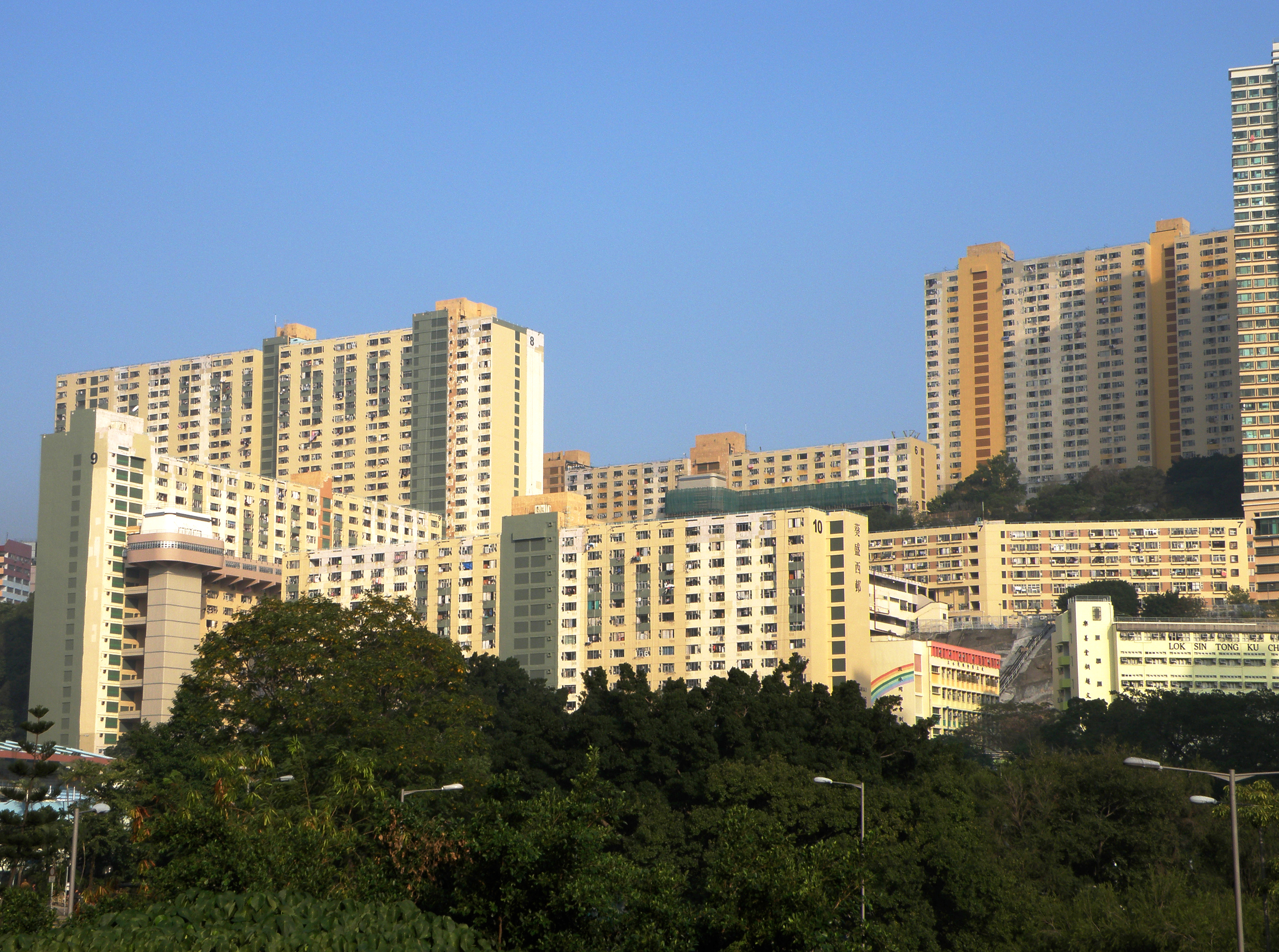
Kwai Shing West Estate

Kwai Shing West Estate (Chinese: 葵盛西邨) is located at the east of Kwai Shing East Estate, and consists of 10 residential buildings completed between 1975 and 1977.

Name	Type	Completion
Block 1	Old Slab	1977
Block 2	Old Slab	1977
Block 3	Old Slab	1976
Block 4	Old Slab	1976
Block 5	Old Slab	1976
Block 6	Old Slab	1976
Block 7	Old Slab	1976
Block 8	Old Slab	1976
Block 9	Old Slab	1976
Block 10	Old Slab	1975

=== Kwai Tsui Estate ===
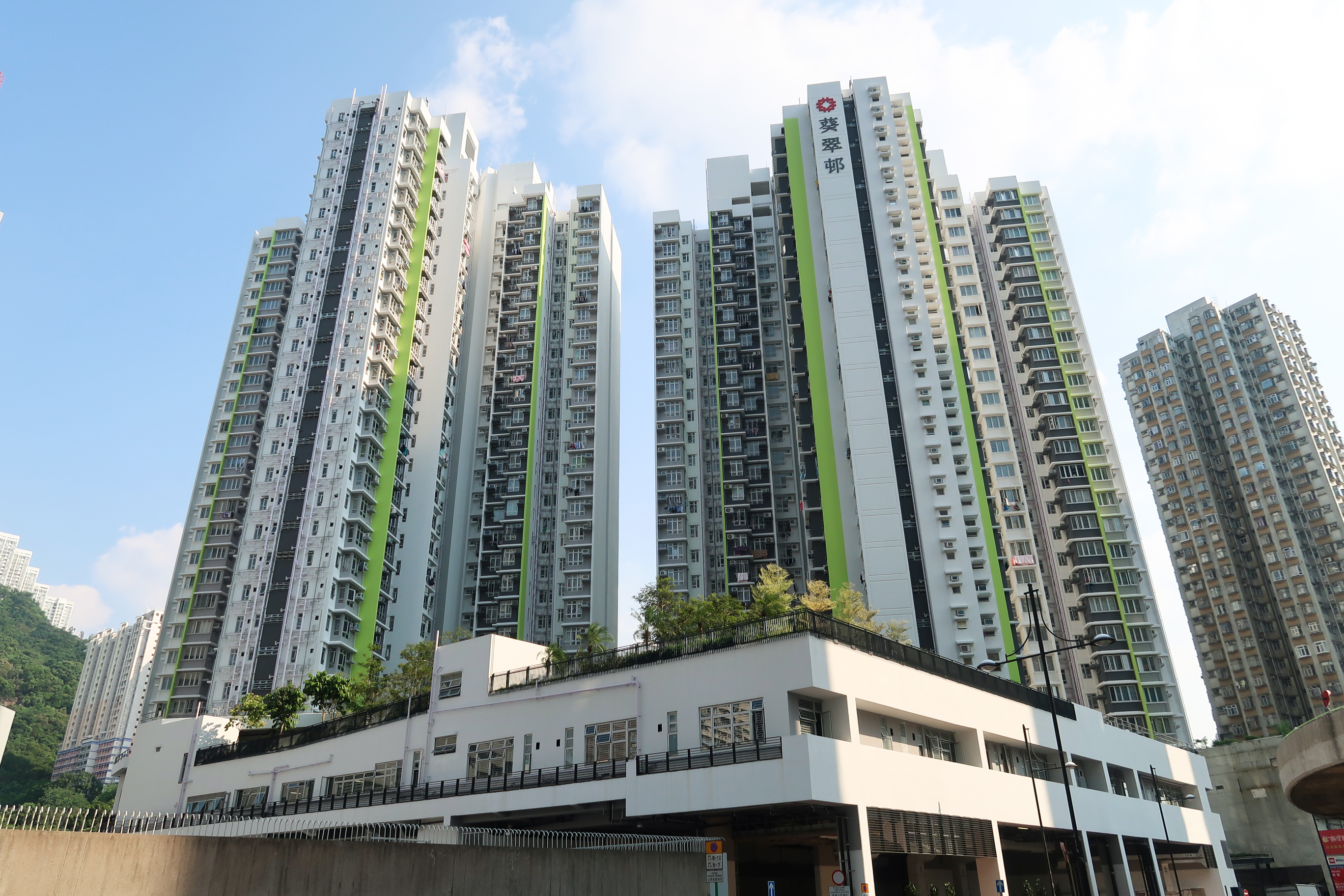
Kwai Tsui Estate

Kwai Tsui Estate (Chinese: 葵翠邨) is a public housing estate built on the site of the former Kwai Chung Police Married Quarters, near MTR Kwai Fong station and Kwai Fong Estate. It comprises two domestic blocks, of 23 and 24 storeys respectively, and a three-storey podium. The estate provides about 866 flats that can accommodate a total population of about 2,400 residents. The first tenants moved in on 30 April 2018.

English name	Chinese name	Type	Completion
Bik Tsui House	碧翠樓	Non-standard block (cruciform design)	2018
Luk Tsui House	綠翠樓	Non-standard block (cruciform design)	2018

=== Lai King Estate ===
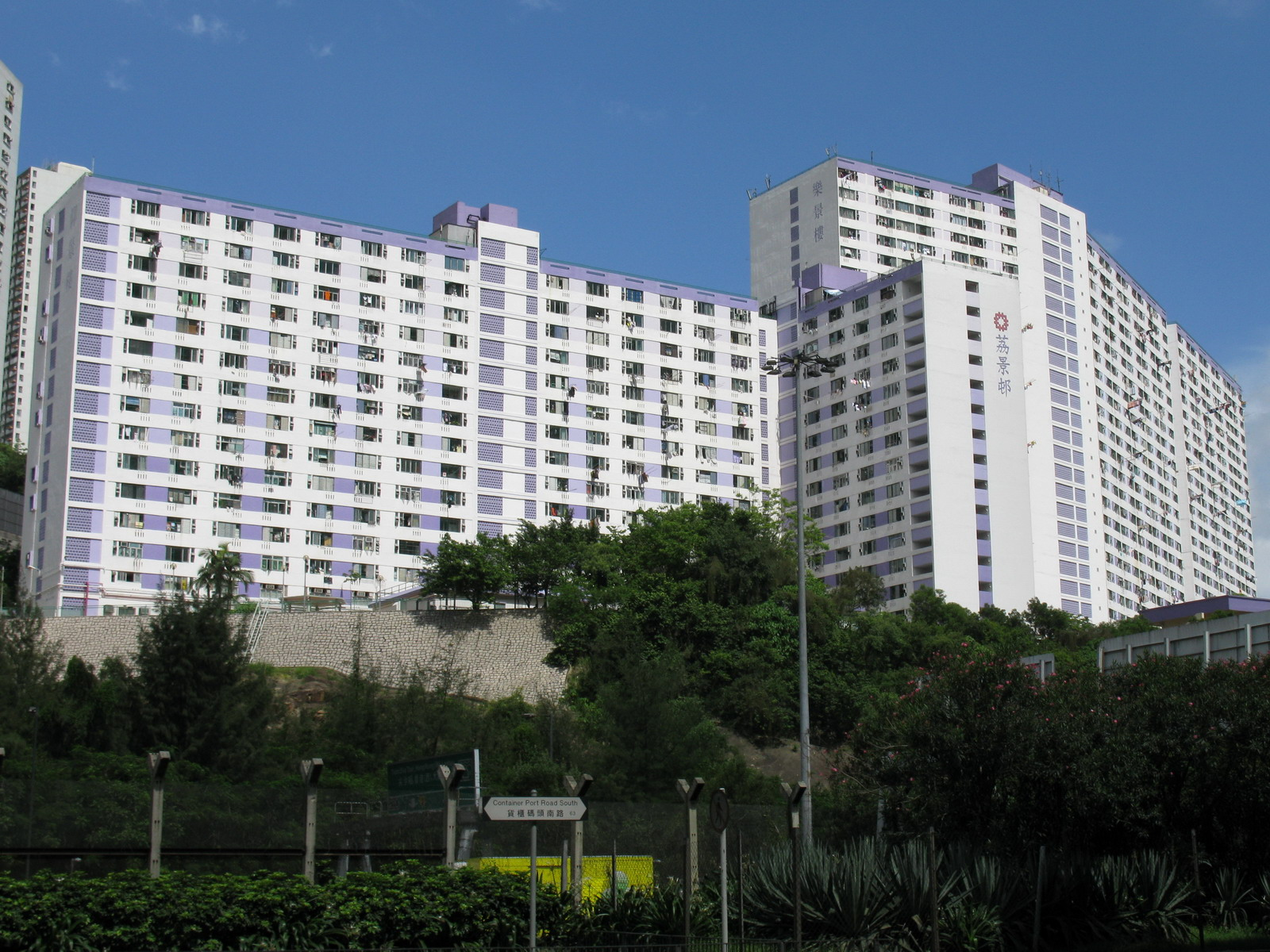
Phase 2, Lai King Estate

Lai King Estate (Chinese: 荔景邨) is one of the oldest public housing estates in Kwai Tsing District. It is divided into 2 phases and consists of a total of 8 residential buildings completed in 1975 (Phase 1), 1976 (Phase 2) and 2022 (Heng King House) respectively. Lai King station is located between the two phases.

Name	Type	Completion
Fung King House (風景樓)	Old Slab (Resettlement Block Mark VII)	1975
Wo King House (和景樓)	Old Slab (Resettlement Block Mark VII)	1975
Yat King House (日景樓)	Old Slab (Resettlement Block Mark VII)	1975
Ming King House (明景樓)	Old Slab (Resettlement Block Mark VII)	1975
Yeung King House (仰景樓)	Old Slab (Resettlement Block Mark VII)	1976
On King House (安景樓)	Old Slab (Resettlement Block Mark VII)	1976
Lok King House (樂景樓)	Old Slab (Resettlement Block Mark VII)	1976
Heng King House (恆景樓)	Non-Standard (Linear Block)	2022

=== Lai Yan Court ===
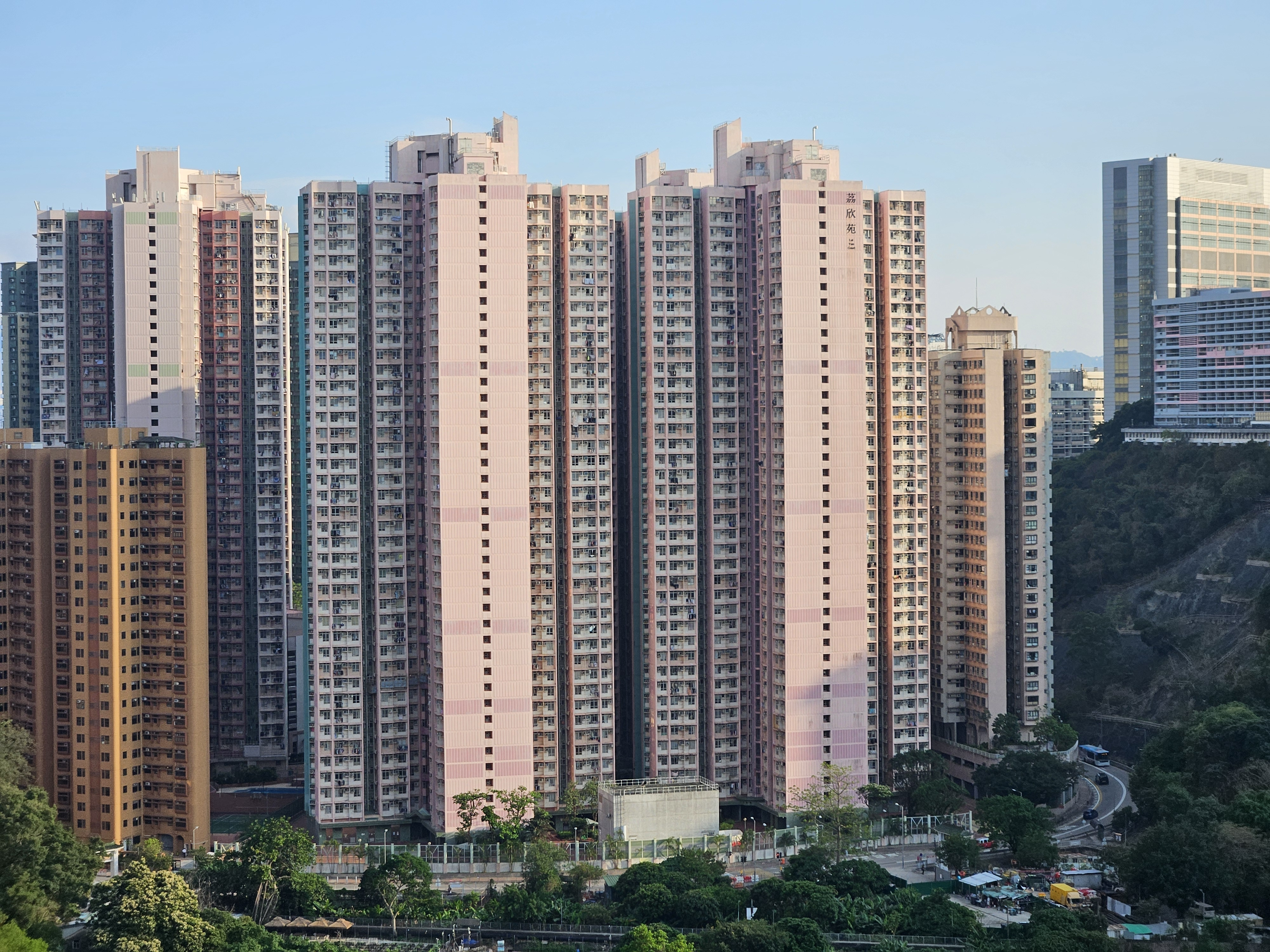
Lai Yan Court

Lai Yan Court (Chinese: 荔欣苑) is a HOS court in Kwai Chung, located near Wah Lai Estate and within walking distance to Mei Foo station. Together with Wah Lai Estate and Nob Hill, it was formerly the site of Lai Chi Kok Amusement Park. It has 3 blocks built in 2001.

Name	Type	Completion
Lai Ying House	Harmony 1	2001
Lai Choi House	Harmony 1	2001
Lai Lam House	Harmony 1	2001

=== Lai Yiu Estate ===
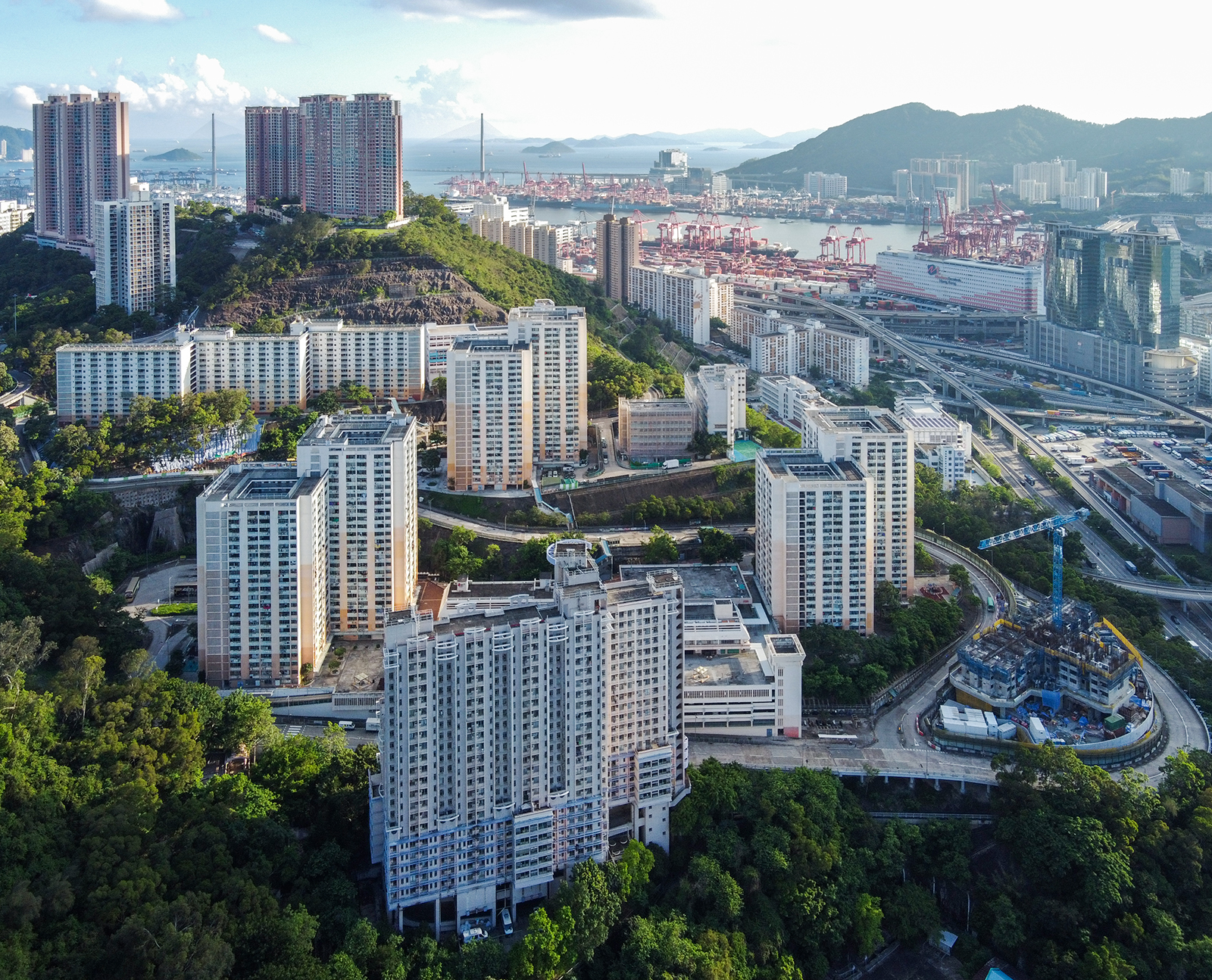
Lai Yiu Estate

Lai Yiu Estate (Chinese: 麗瑤邨) is located at the north mid-level of Lai King Estate. It consists of 5 residential buildings completed in 1976, 1977 and 1999 respectively.

Name	Type	Completion
Fu Yiu House	Twin Tower	1976
Kwai Yiu House	Twin Tower	1977
Lok Yiu House	Twin Tower	1977
Wah Yiu House	Old Slab	1977
Wing Yiu House	Small Household Block	1999

=== Ning Fung Court ===
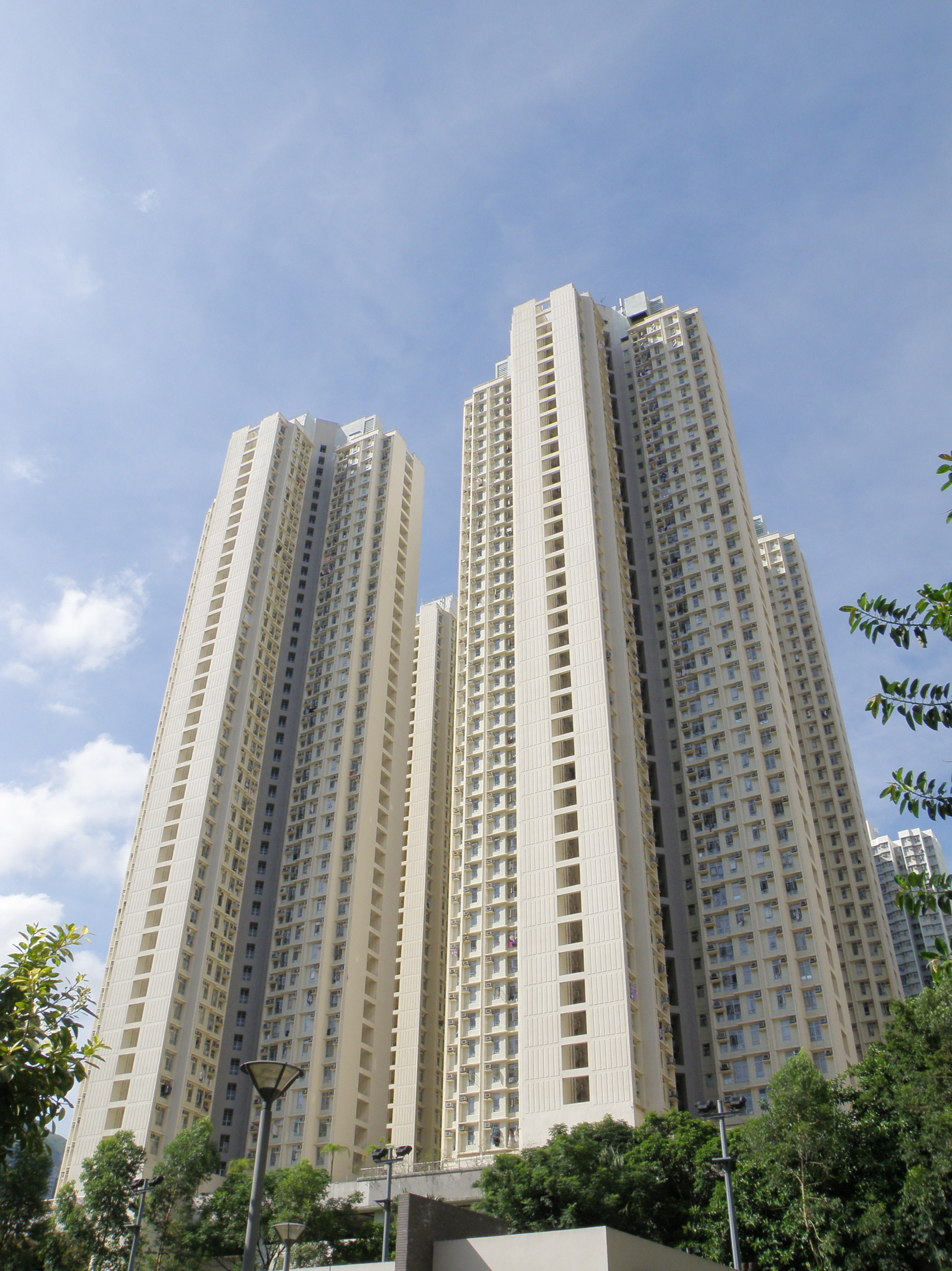
Ning Fung Court

Ning Fung Court (Chinese: 寧峰苑) is a HOS court in North Kwai Chung, located near Shek Yam Estate and Shek Yam East Estate.

Name	Type	Completion
Ching Fung House	Concord 1	2001
Long Fung House	Concord 1	2001
Ting Fung House	Concord 1	2001
Yun Fung House	Concord 1	2001

=== On Yam Estate ===
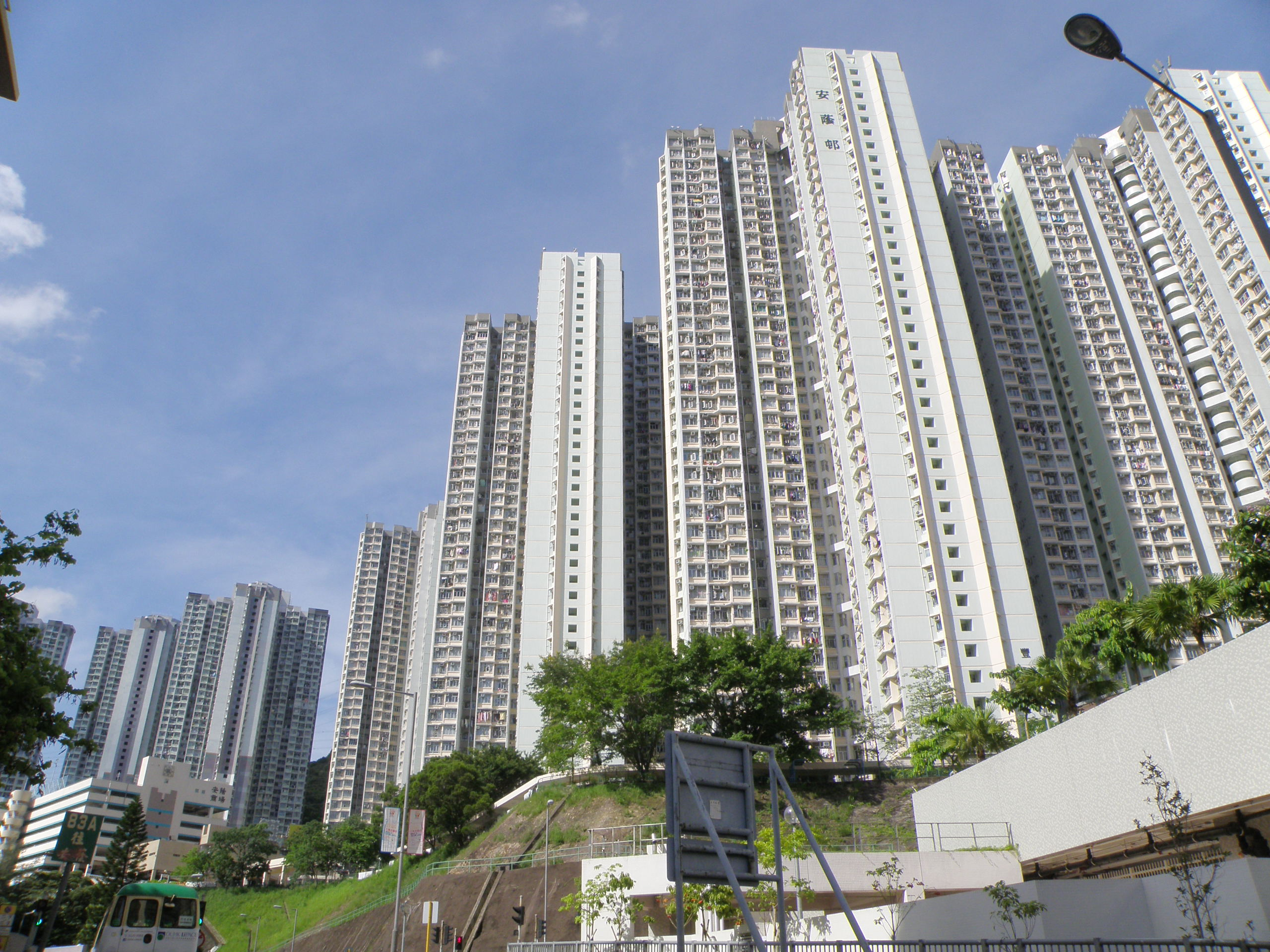
On Yam Estate

On Yam Estate (Chinese: 安蔭邨) is situated on land which was formerly the location of Shek Yam Temporary Housing Area (Chinese: 石蔭臨時房屋區) and Shek Lei Temporary Housing Area (Chinese: 石籬臨時房屋區). The estate consists of 8 residential buildings (in Phase 1 and 2) completed in 1994 and 1995.

Name	Type	Completion
Hong Yam House	Harmony 1	1994
Kar Yam House	Harmony 1	1994
Cheung Yam House	Harmony 1	1994
Yiu Yam House	Harmony 1	1995
Tak Yam House	Harmony 1	1995
Chak Yam House	Harmony 1	1995
Fung Yam House	Harmony 1	1995
Shing Yam House	Harmony 1	1995

=== Shek Lei Estate ===
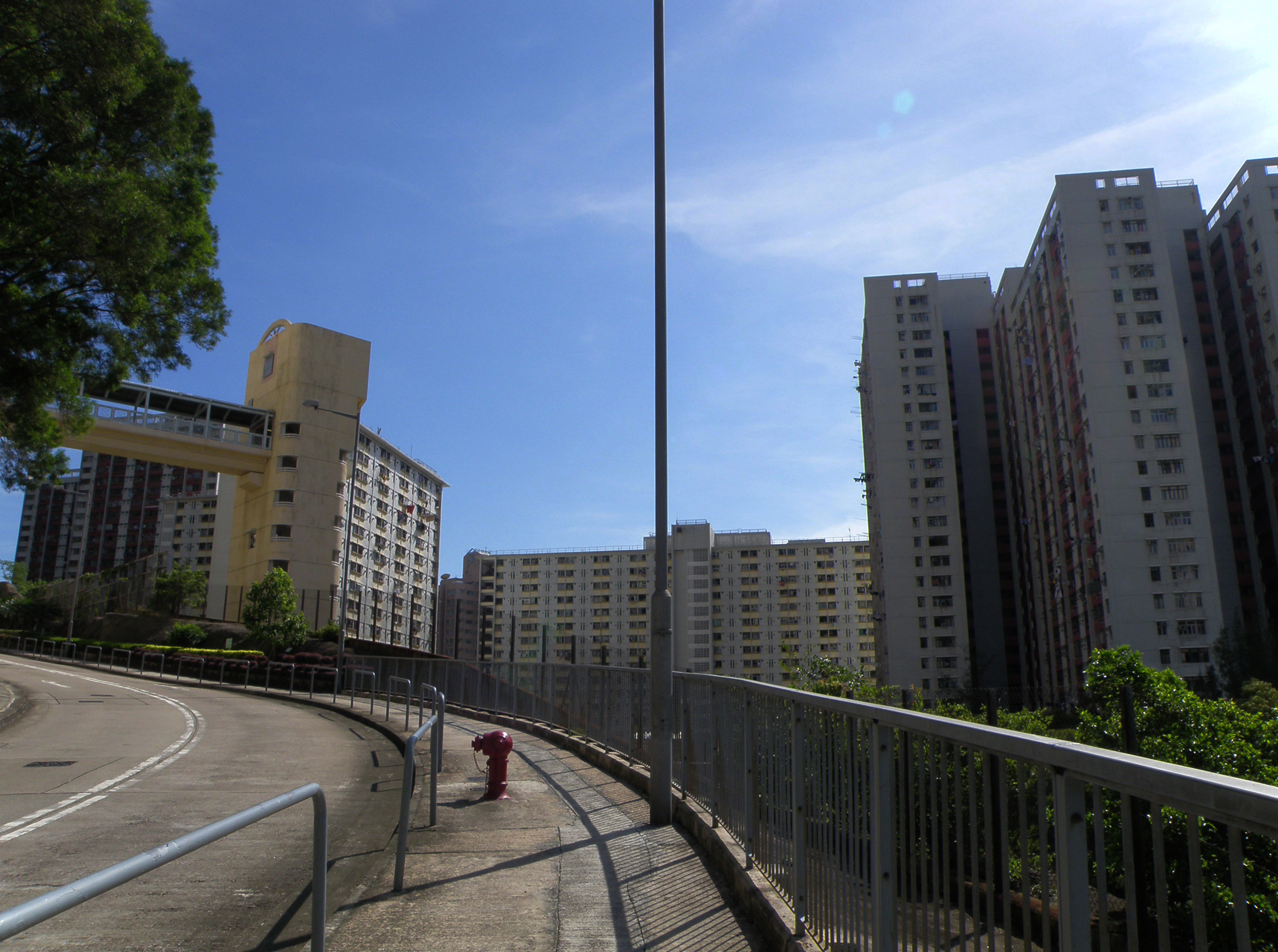
Shek Lei (I) Estate

Shek Lei Estate (Chinese: 石籬邨) is located near Shek Yam Estate, On Yam Estate and Shek Yam East Estate. The estate separates into three parts, Shek Lei (I) Estate (Chinese: 石籬(一)邨), Shek Lei (II) Estate (Chinese: 石籬(二)邨) and Shek Lei Interim Housing (Chinese: 石籬中轉房屋). It has totally 22 blocks and 2 shopping centres with a population of about 35,000. It is currently the second largest public housing estates in Kwai Chung.

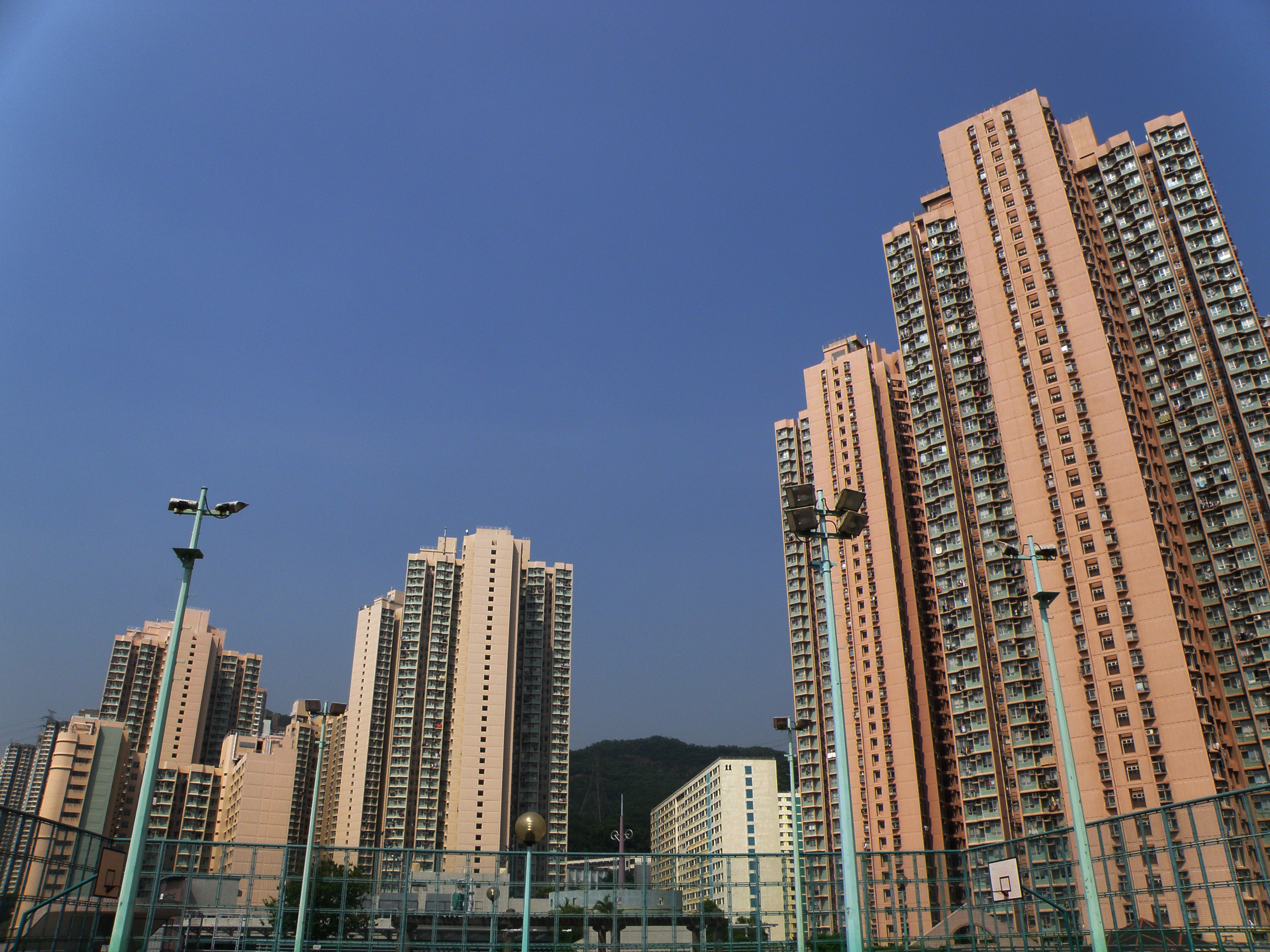
Shek Lei (II) Estate

=== Shek Yam East Estate ===
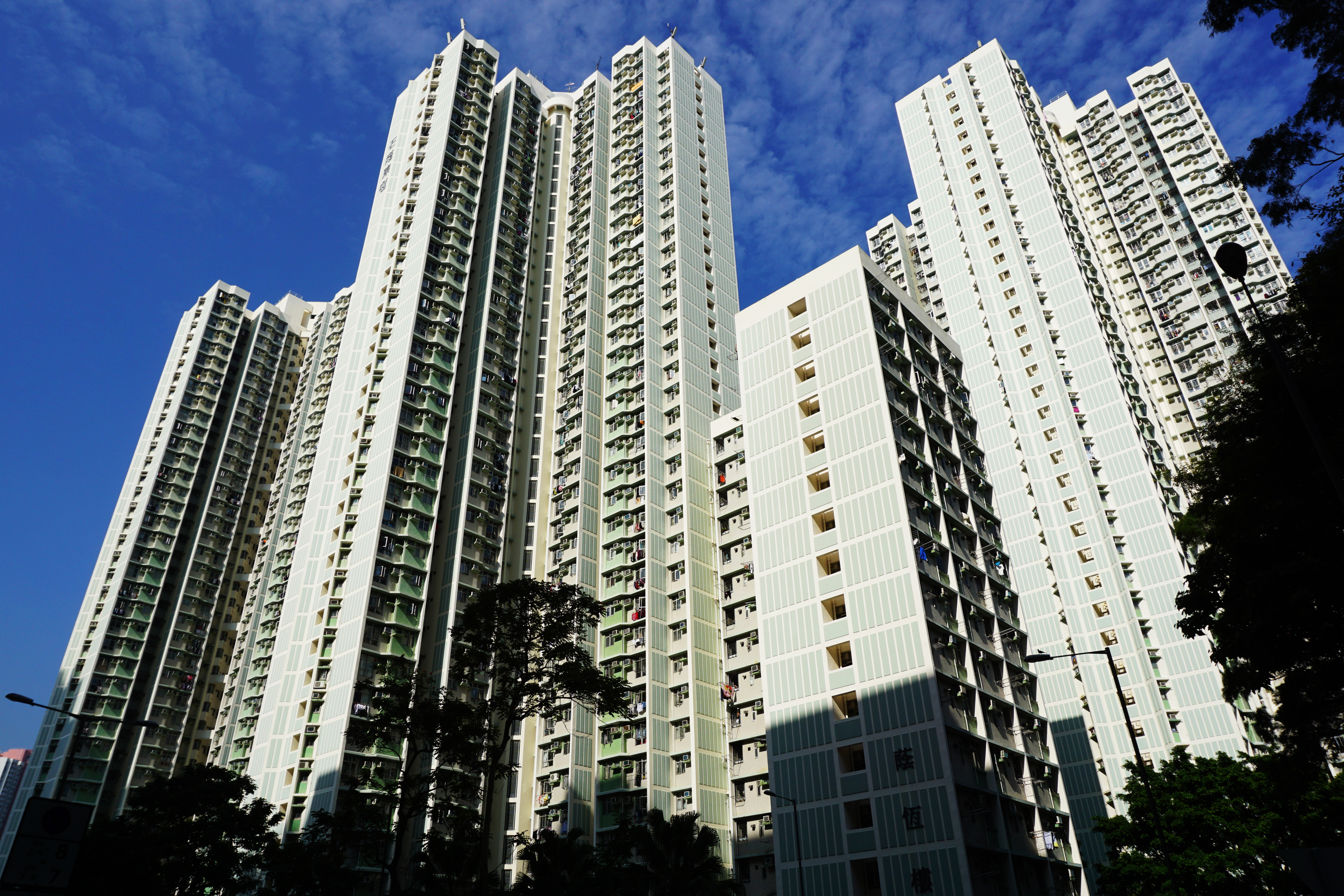
Shek Yam East Estate

Shek Yam East Estate (Chinese: 石蔭東邨) was developed by the HKHA, and the year of intake was 1996. It was developed on the former site of Tai Pak Tin Temporary Housing Area (Chinese: 大白田臨時房屋區), and not as a redevelopment of Shek Yam Estate. It is therefore considered as an independent estate. Shek Yam East Estate is a comparatively small public housing estate for Hong Kong standards, comprising three 39-floor residential buildings, without market and shopping centre. It comprises a total of 2,500 apartments, with sizes ranging from 13.6 to 49 m^{2}. The authorized population was 6,500 at the end of 2007. The nearby Shek Yam Shopping Centre, located within Shek Yam Estate serves this estate.

Name	Type	Completion
Yam Heng House	Harmony 1	1996
Yam Hing House	Harmony 1	1996
Yam Yue House	Harmony 1	1996

=== Shek Yam Estate ===
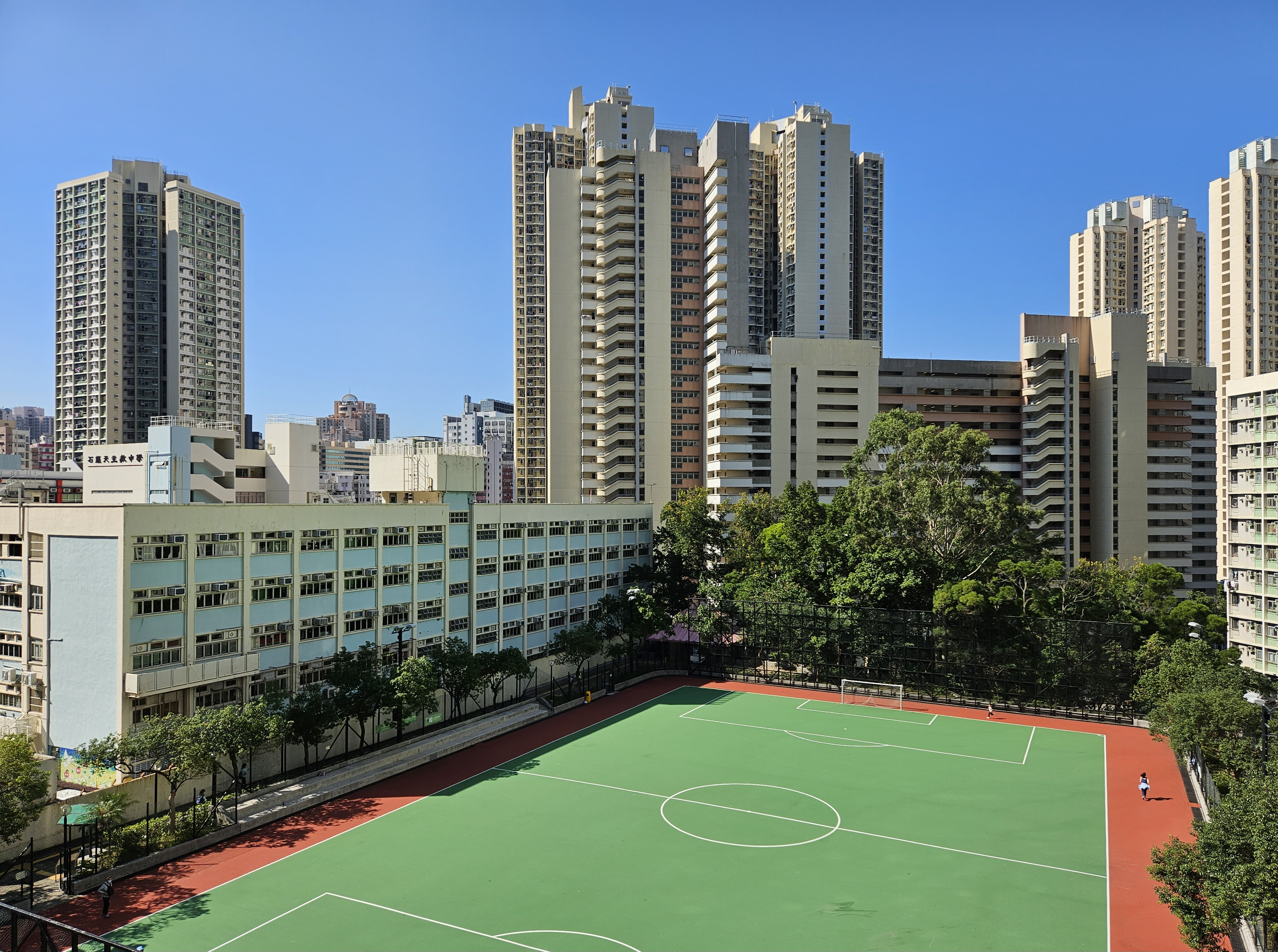
Shek Yam Estate

Shek Yam Estate (Chinese: 石蔭邨) was the first Government Low Cost Housing Scheme estate in Kwai Chung. It had 8 blocks built in 1968, which were all demolished in the 1990s and 2000s.

The estate was redeveloped into 4 phases. Phase 2 consists of three rental residential blocks, a car park podium and a shopping centre which were completed in 2000. Phase 3 consists of four HOS concord-typed blocks, Ning Fung Court. Phase 1 and Phase 4 were handed over to Leisure and Cultural Services Department to construct a park, Sham Yam Lei Muk Road Park. Phase 5 was the old site of Shek Yam Community Hall and a HOS building, but it was renamed Lai Shek House and changed to rental use.

Name	Type	Completion
Chi Shek House	Harmony 1	2000
Yan Shek House	Harmony 1	2000
Yung Shek House	Linear 1	2000
Lai Shek House	Non-standard	2006

=== Sheung Man Court ===
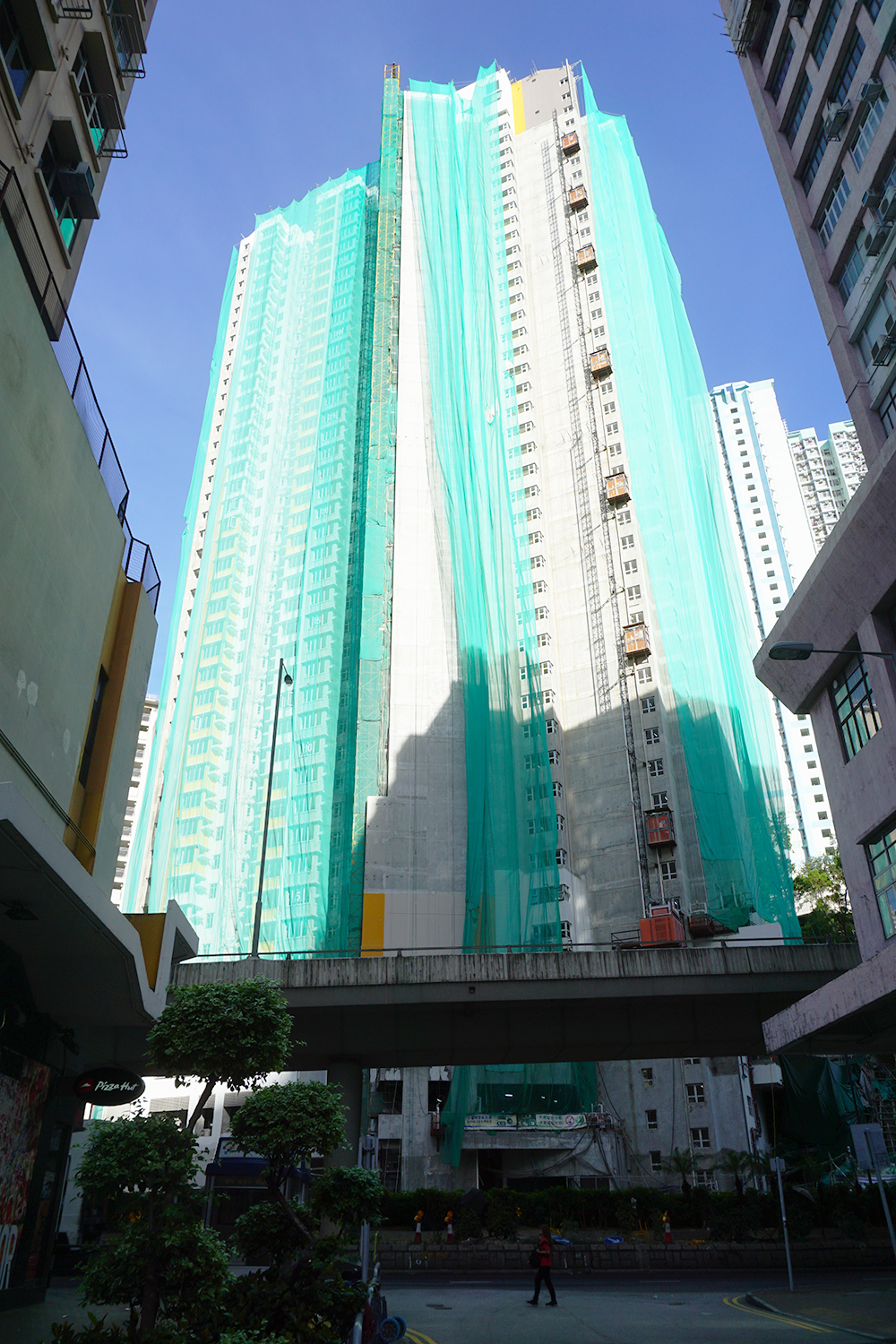
Sheung Man Court

Sheung Man Court (Chinese: 尚文苑) is a Home Ownership Scheme court in Texaco Road, Kwai Chung, near Tai Wo Hau Estate and MTR Tai Wo Hau station. It comprises one block with 494 flats in total. Saleable flat area ranges from 26.6 to 42.6 square metres sold from HK$1.77M to HK$3.54M, after applying a 41% discount from the assessed market values. It was sold in 2019 and is expected to complete in 2020.

Although the court is just opposite to Tsuen Wan Town Centre and is named with prefix "Sheung" (another one is Sheung Chui Court), it is located at the east side of Texaco Road and so belongs to Kwai Tsing District instead of Tsuen Wan District.

Name	Type	Completion
Sheung Man Court	Non-standard	2020

=== Tai Wo Hau Estate / Kwai Yin Court ===
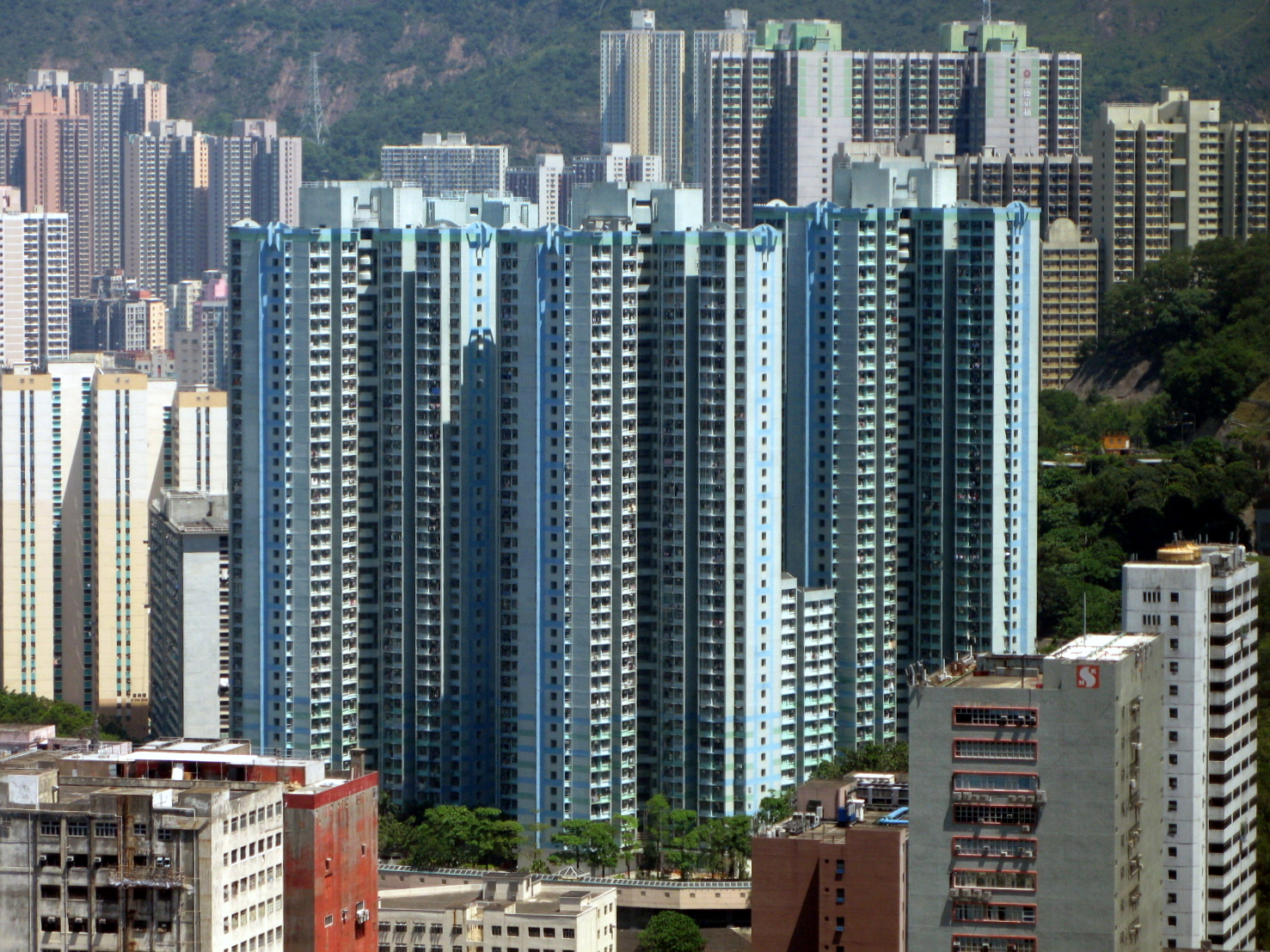
Tai Wo Hau Estate (harmony blocks)

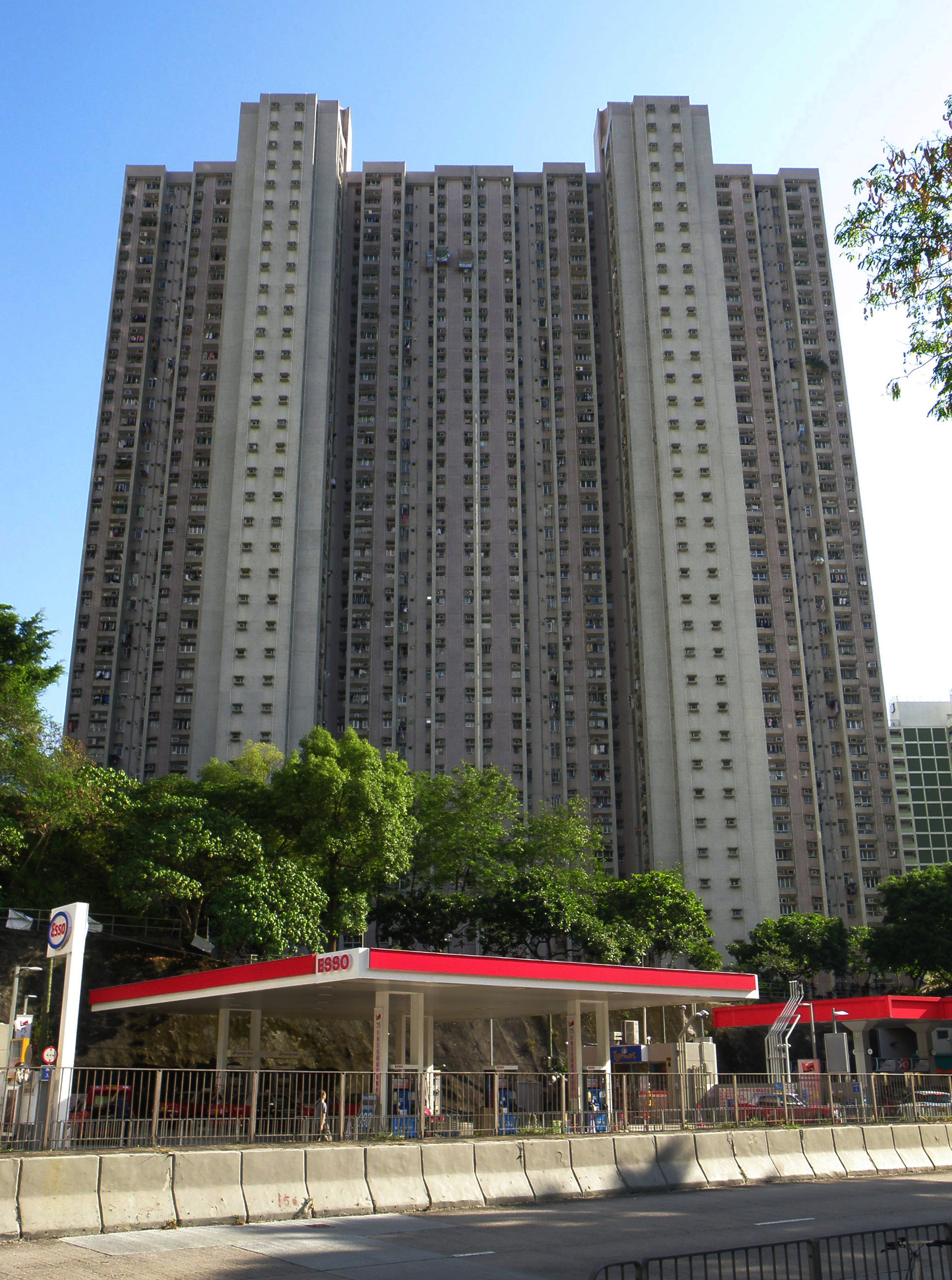
Kwai Yin Court

=== Tsui Yiu Court ===
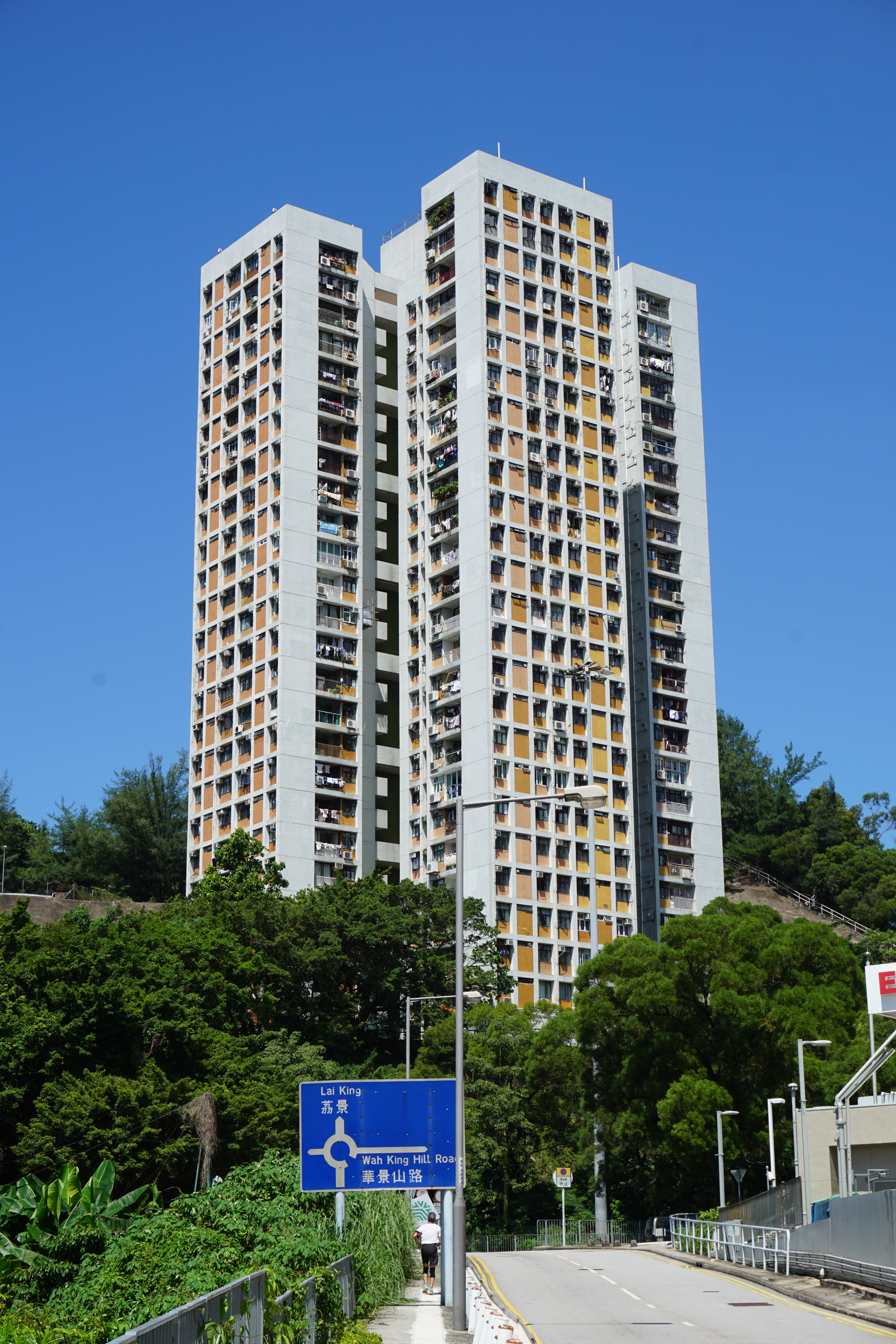
Tsui Yiu Court

Tsui Yiu Court is a HOS court in Lai King Hill, Kwai Chung, near Lai Yiu Estate and Castle Peak Road (Kwai Chung Section). It has 1 block built in 1981. It has a design that resembles the swastika symbol, although it is not affiliated with it.

Name	Type	Completion
Tsui Yiu Court	Non-standard	1981

=== Wah Lai Estate ===
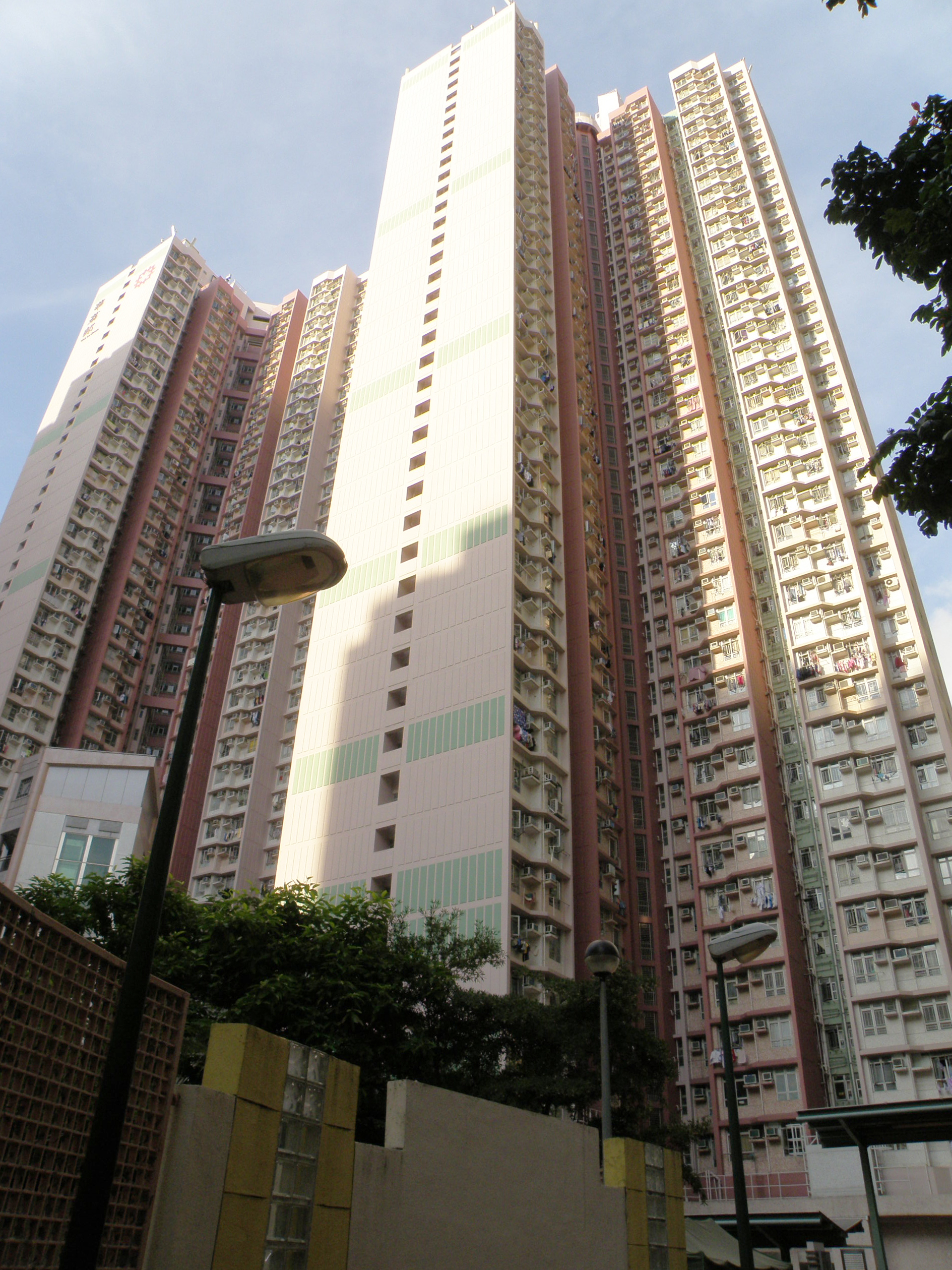
Wah Lai Estate

Wah Lai Estate (Chinese: 華荔邨) consists of two residential buildings completed in 2001.

Although it administratively belongs to Kwai Tsing District, it is very near Mei Foo Sun Chuen, Lai Chi Kok rather than other parts in Kwai Chung. Sham Shui Po District Council requested the government to include the estate into its district, but there are still no changes in the boundary related to the estate. However, the government decided to include the entire Nob Hill, a private housing estate next to Wah Lai Estate, into Sham Shui Po District in 2007.

Name	Type	Completion
Hei Lai House	Harmony 1	2001
Seung Lai House	Harmony 1	2001

=== Yi Fung Court ===
Yi Fung Court (Chinese: 怡峰苑) is a HOS court in the upper hill of Shek Lei Extension, Lei Pui Street. It has totally 2 blocks built in 1999.

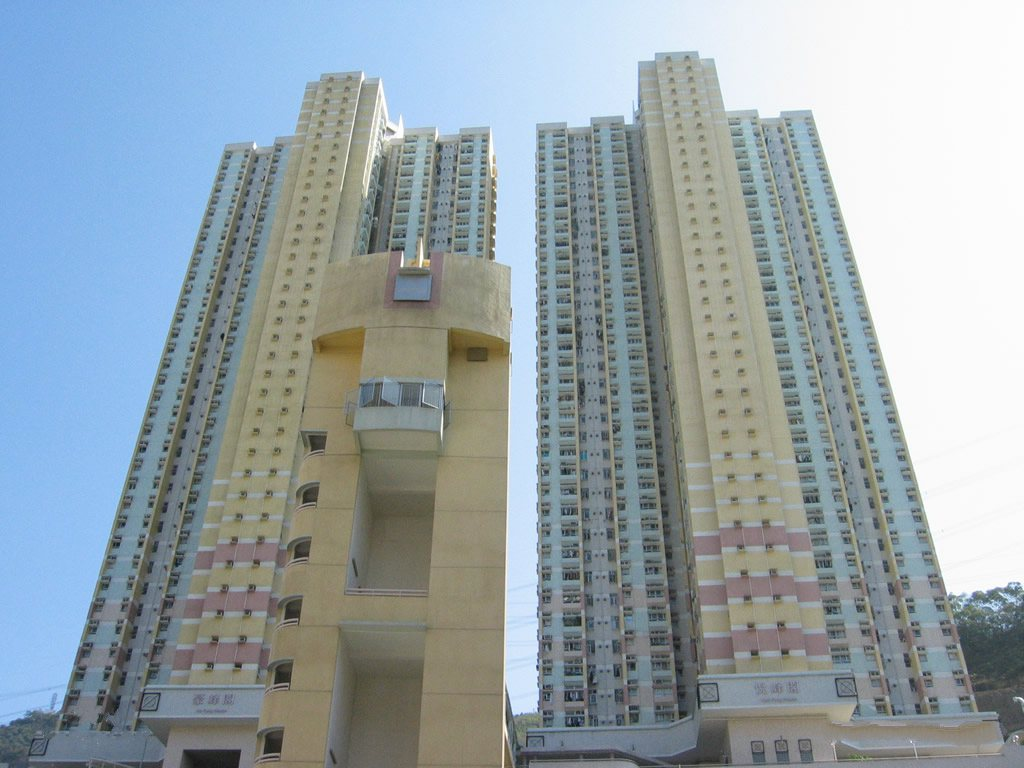
Yi Fung Court

=== Yin Lai Court ===
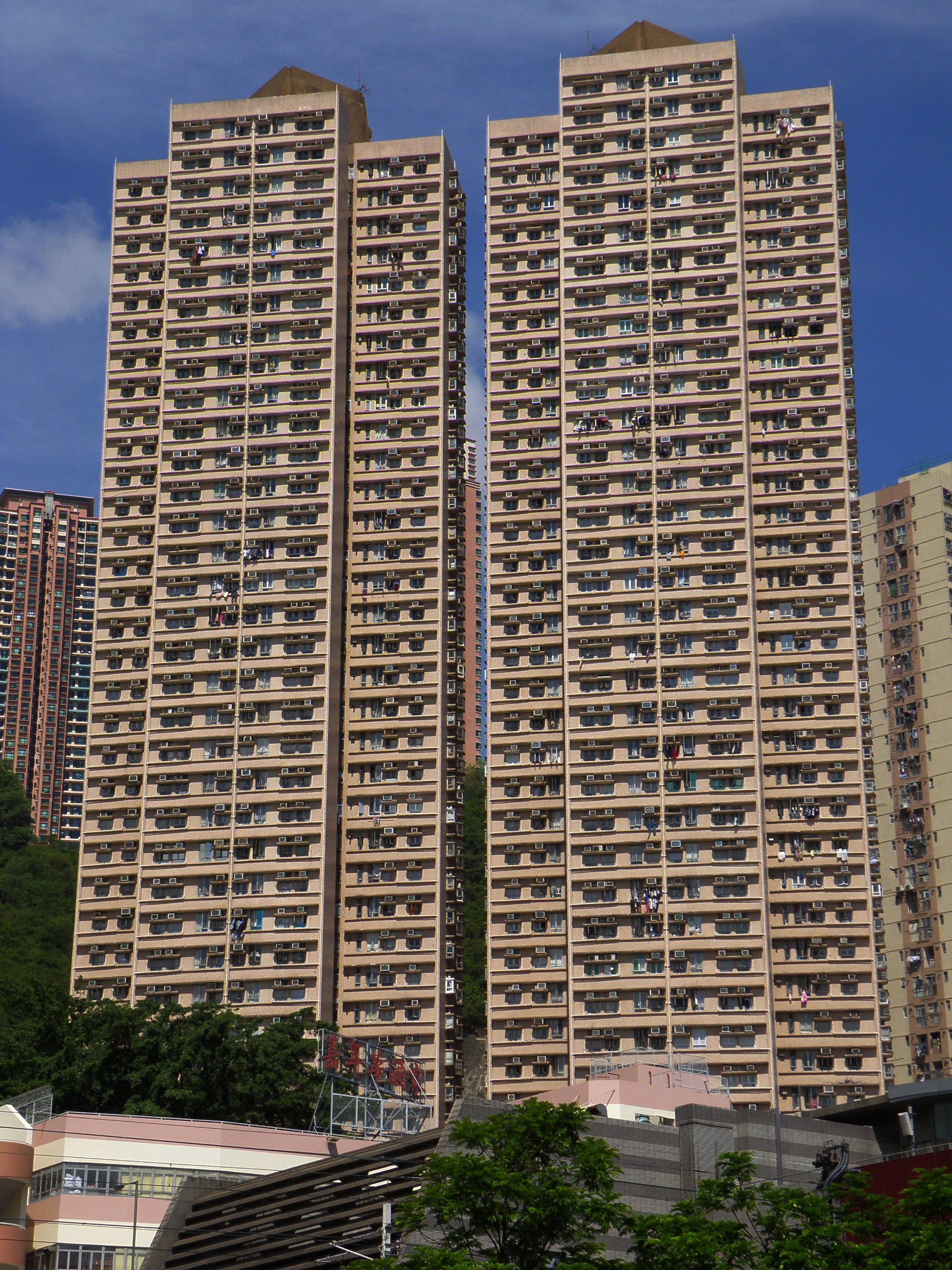
Yin Lai Court

Yin Lai Court (Chinese: 賢麗苑) is a HOS court in Kwai Chung, near Lai King Estate and Lai King station. It has two blocks and a shopping centre built in 1991.

Name	Type	Completion
Yin Kwong House	Flexi 3	1991
Yin Tak House	Flexi 3	1991

=== Yuet Lai Court ===
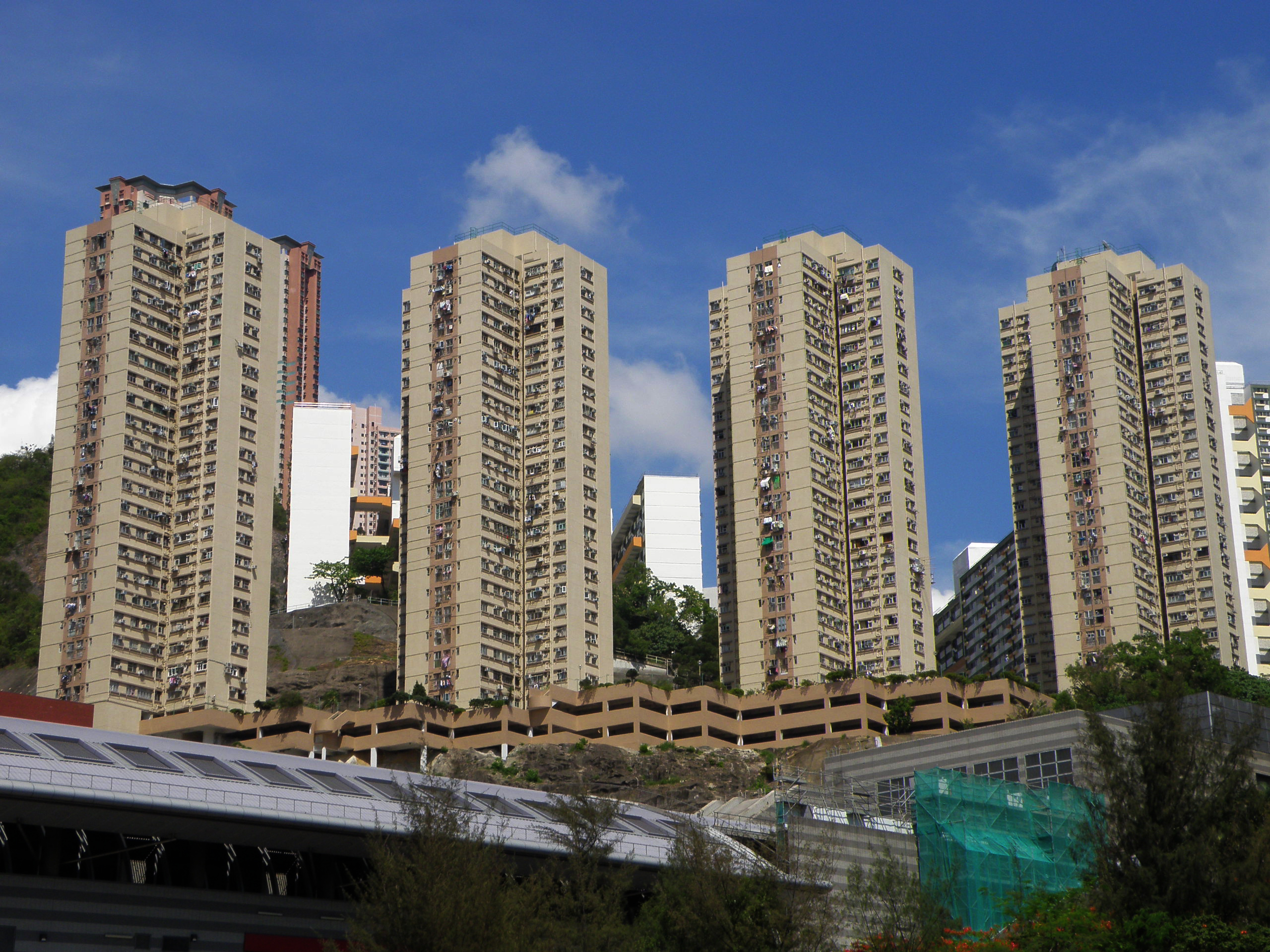
Yuet Lai Court

Yuet Lai Court (Chinese: 悅麗苑) is a HOS court in Kwai Chung, near Lai King Estate and Lai King station. It has totally 4 blocks, located at the east of Lai King Hill Road. It was sold to the public through Home Ownership Scheme Phase 1 in 1981. It is one of the earliest HOS courts in Hong Kong.

Name	Type	Completion
Lai Wan House	Non-Standard	1981
Lai Wah House	Non-Standard	1981
Lai Ha House	Non-Standard	1981
Lai Hung House	Non-Standard	1981
