= Shek Yam Estate =

Public housing estate in Kwai Chung, Hong Kong

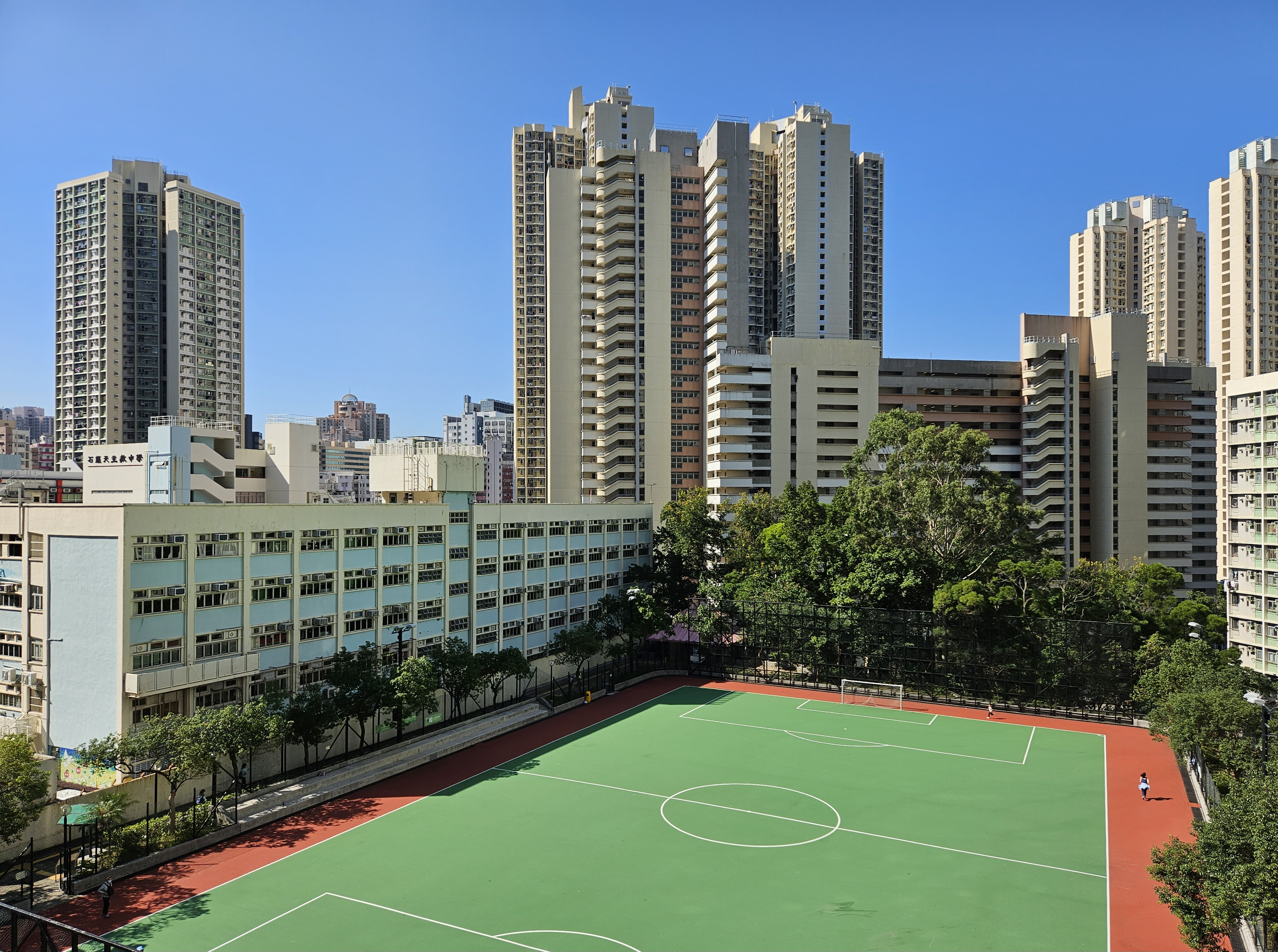
- Shek Yam Estate
- Interactive map of Shek Yam Estate

General information
- Location: 120 Lei Muk Road, North Kwai Chung; New Territories, Hong Kong
- Coordinates: 22.372125°N 114.139447°E
- Status: Completed
- Category: Public rental housing
- Population: 8,657 (2016)
- No. of blocks: 4
- No. of units: 2,331

Construction
- Constructed: 1968; 58 years ago (Before reconstruction); 2000; 26 years ago (After reconstruction)
- Authority: Hong Kong Housing Authority

Shek Yam Estate (Chinese: 石蔭邨) is a public housing estate in North Kwai Chung, New Territories, Hong Kong. It was the first Government Low Cost Housing Scheme estate in Kwai Chung. It had 8 blocks built in 1968, which were all demolished in the 1990s and 2000s.

Ning Fung Court (Chinese: 寧峰苑) is a Home Ownership Scheme court in North Kwai Chung, near Shek Yam Estate and Shek Yam East Estate. It has 4 blocks built in 2001.

== Background ==
The estate was redeveloped into 4 phases. Phase 2 consists of three rental residential blocks, a car park podium and a shopping centre which were completed in 2000. Phase 3 consists of four HOS concord-typed blocks, Ning Fung Court. Phase 1 and Phase 4 were handed over to Leisure and Cultural Services Department to construct a park, Sham Yam Lei Muk Road Park. Phase 5 was the old site of Shek Yam Community Hall and a HOS building, but it was renamed Lai Shek House and changed to rental use.

== Houses ==
=== Shek Yam Estate ===
Name	Chinese name	Building type	Completed
Chi Shek House	智石樓	Harmony 1	2000
Yan Shek House	仁石樓	Harmony 1	2000
Yung Shek House	勇石樓	Single Aspect Building	2000
Lai Shek House	禮石樓	Non-standard	2005

=== Ning Fung Court ===
Name	Chinese name	Building type	Completed
Ching Fung House	晴峰閣	Concord 1	2001
Long Fung House	朗峰閣	Concord 1	2001
Ting Fung House	庭峰閣	Concord 1	2001
Yun Fung House	潤峰閣	Concord 1	2001

== Demographics ==
According to the 2016 by-census, Shek Yam Estate had a population of 8,657 while Ning Fung Court had a population of 3,816. Altogether the population amounts to 12,473.

== Politics ==
Shek Yam Estate and Ning Fung Court are located in Shek Yam constituency of the Kwai Tsing District Council. It was formerly represented by Andrew Wan Siu-kin, who was elected in the 2019 elections until May 2021.

== Education ==
Shek Yam is in Primary One Admission (POA) School Net 64, which includes multiple aided schools (schools operated independently of the government but funded with government money); none of the schools in the net are government schools.

== See also ==
- Public housing estates in Kwai Chung
