= Shek Yam East Estate =

Public housing estate in Kwai Chung, Hong Kong

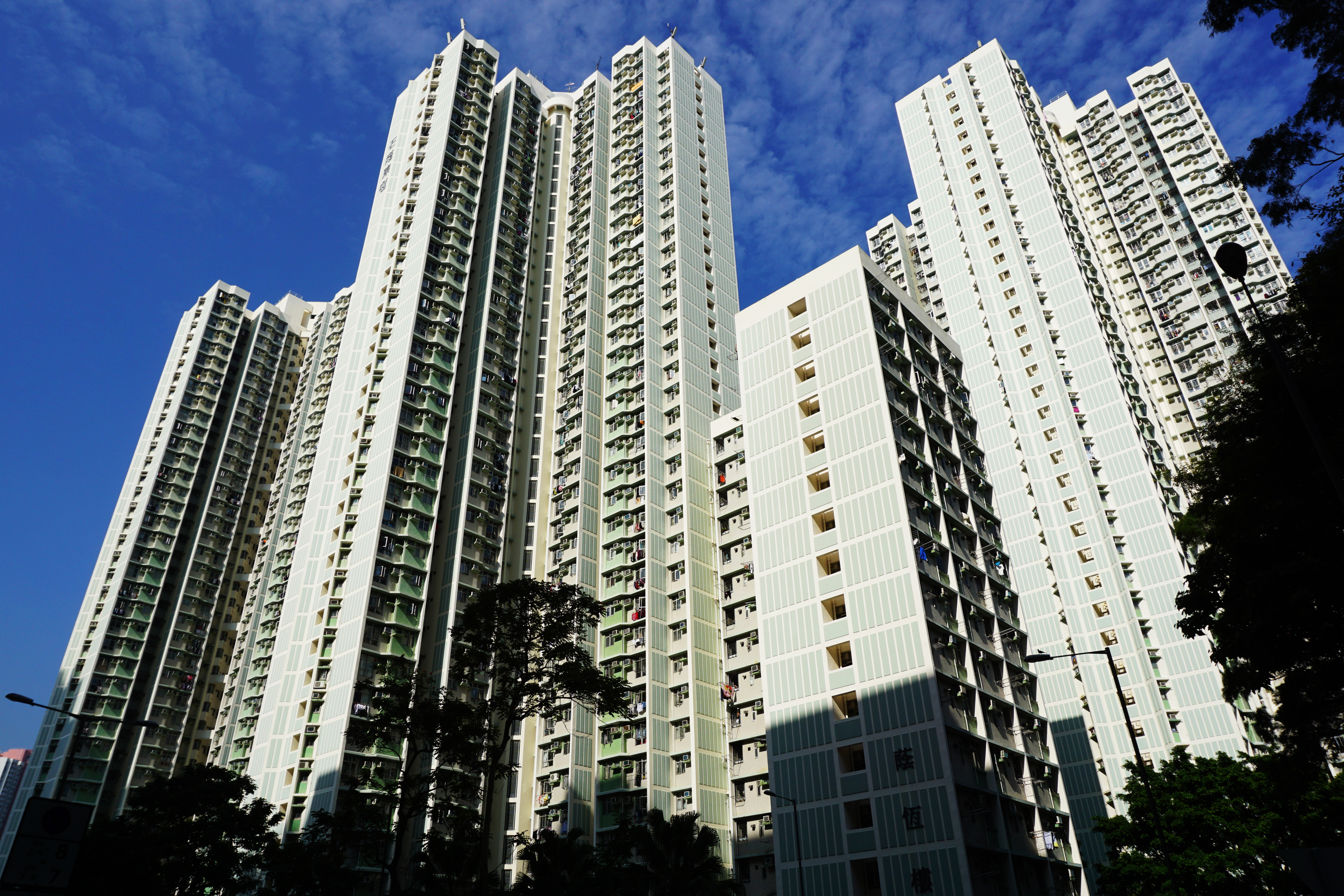
- Shek Yam East Estate
- Interactive map of Shek Yam East Estate

General information
- Location: 130 Tai Pak Tin Street, North Kwai Chung; New Territories, Hong Kong
- Coordinates: 22.372125°N 114.139447°E
- Status: Completed
- Category: Public rental housing
- Population: 6,647 (2016)
- No. of blocks: 3
- No. of units: 2,331

Construction
- Constructed: 1996; 30 years ago
- Authority: Hong Kong Housing Authority

Shek Yam East Estate (Chinese: 石蔭東邨) is a public housing estate in North Kwai Chung, New Territories, Hong Kong. It has three blocks built in 1996. It was developed on the former site of Tai Pak Tin Temporary Housing Area (Chinese: 大白田臨時房屋區), and not as a redevelopment of Shek Yam Estate. It is therefore considered as an independent estate.

== Houses ==
Name	Chinese name	Building type	Completed
Yam Heng House	蔭恆樓	Harmony 1 with Harmony Annex 2	1996
Yam Hing House	蔭興樓	Harmony 1	1996
Yam Yue House	蔭裕樓	Harmony 1	1996

== Demographics ==
According to the 2016 by-census, Shek Yam East Estate had a population of 6,647. The median age was 47.2, and the majority of residents (95.9 per cent) were of Chinese ethnicity. The average household size was 2.9 people. The median monthly household income of all households (i.e. including both economically active and inactive households) was HK$23,000.

== Politics ==
Shek Yam East Estate is located in Shek Yam constituency of the Kwai Tsing District Council. It was formerly represented by Andrew Wan Siu-kin, who was elected in the 2019 elections until May 2021.

== See also ==
- Public housing estates in Kwai Chung
