= Temporary Housing Area =

A Temporary Housing Area (THA; Chinese: 臨時房屋區) is an area designated for people living in temporary houses made by wood frames and zinc plates in Hong Kong. The houses are built by the Hong Kong Government beginning in 1964 to replace wooden huts and squatter areas that began to emerge in the late 1940s and 1950s. The name was created in the 1980s to replace the original reference of Licensed area.

The building design was likely influenced from military barracks.

Each house is divided into tens of tiny flats, with one flat per household. Most of the THAs were demolished by the 1990s and the last demolished was in 2001.

The THA is being replaced by Interim Housing, a more resilient temporary home concept since the 1970s.

== Life ==
Living in a THA affords little privacy. Interior walls are only visual barriers. Cooking and showering can only be done outside the flat. Toilets were common areas for all residents to use; additionally, open sewer channels along the walkways connecting the THAs were often used by residents to brush their teeth or laundry.

Temporary housing serves displaced people while the city is being planned or if their house is being remodeled or relocation from disasters like fire or typhoons.

== See also ==
- Mount Davis
- Shau Kei Wan
- King's Park (Ho Man Tin)
- Lai Chi Kok
