= Railway Development Strategy =

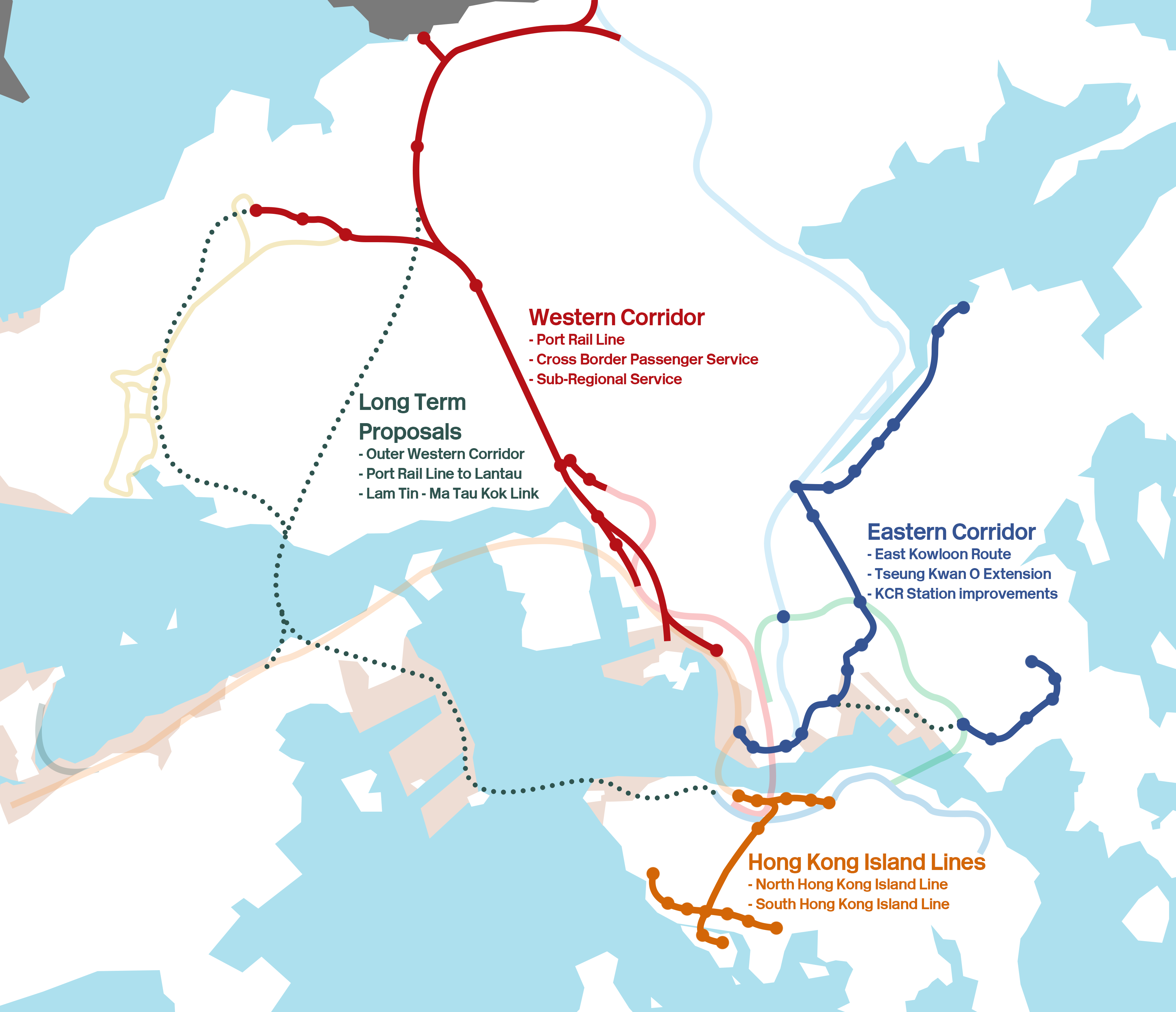
- Author: Hong Kong Government Transport Branch
- Language: English/Traditional Chinese
- Subject: Transport Planning
- Publication date: December 1994
- Publication place: Hong Kong
- Pages: 22

The Railway Development Strategy was a comprehensive planning document prepared by the Hong Kong Government in 1994 to create a framework for the future expansion of Hong Kong's railway network. The strategy was based on the original proposals from the 1990 White Paper on Transport Policy and findings from the 1993 Railway Development Study with views from the public consultation taken into account. The study and the strategy were conducted in response to the increasing number of passengers in local and cross border journeys, and the necessity to relieve the city of congestion in road traffic and the existing transport network.

The proposals from the Railway Development Study can be grouped into four sectors:

- Western Corridor
- Eastern Corridor
- Hong Kong Island Lines
- Long Term Proposals

Proposals from each sector were evaluated individually again according to viability and cost in the Railway Development Strategy, and were further refined from the original schemes proposed in 1993. The proposals were sorted by priority with advice on implementation.

== Railway Development Study (1993) ==
The strategy gave a brief summary of the aims and proposals of the Railway Development Study.

The study had 3 main objectives:

- Establish an optimal railway network for the Territory compatible with overall transport and land use requirements
- Establish a priority list of recommended railway projects
- Determine the preferred alignments of the selected railways for defining the extent of route protection.

The study assessed through 90 schemes, in which four main proposals emerged from the evaluation process:

=== Western Corridor ===
The Western Corridor was an early form of the West Rail Line, which is now a part of the Tuen Ma Line, and the Northern Link plans. It consisted of 3 projects:

==== Port Rail Line ====
The construction of a rail connection from the border with China to the container port at Kwai Chung was considered to be an important component of future development of rail-based freight transport in Hong Kong. The rail line would have alleviated the road network of its current container freight traffic and allowed for more freight containers to be transported more efficiently. The estimated increase in freight transport would have enhanced Hong Kong's status as an entreport and complemented China's new North South Rail corridor and their plans to expand container usage in freight. A new Port-Rail Terminal would have been constructed at the backup area of Kwai Chung Container Terminal No. 8 as part of the project.

==== Cross Border Passenger Service ====
As the number of cross-border journeys were expected to continually increase, a new cross-border passenger service was recommended to relieve the existing KCR line and provide a reduction of travel times through faster trains. The service would have shared its track with the Port Rail Line and Sub-Regional Passenger Service, where the line would have connected with the existing KCR line at Lo Wu and a second border crossing point at Lok Ma Chau. A new passenger rail terminal was proposed to be constructed on the new West Kowloon Reclamation near Tai Kok Tsui.

==== Sub-Regional Passenger Service ====
The Sub-Regional Passenger Service was recommended as a rail link between Yuen Long, Tin Shui Wai, and the urban areas of Hong Kong as a response to the growing population and demand of the Western New Territories. The service would have shared most of its track with the Port Rail Line and Cross Border Passenger Service, where it would branch off after Kam Tin to the new towns of Yuen Long and Tin Shui Wai. The Light Rail Transit would have served as a feeder service to the rail link, increasing the coverage of the Sub-Regional Passenger Service.

The Sub-Regional Passenger Service was also proposed to be a branch of the Airport Railway. It would have split from the railway at Lai King to Tsuen Wan Waterfront, where it would join the Western Corridor. An extension of the Tsuen Wan Line to Tsuen King Circuit and an unspecified station north of Tsuen Wan with an interchange to services using the Western Corridor.

=== Eastern Corridor ===
The Eastern Corridor consisted of 3 projects, which evolved into Tseung Kwan O Line and parts of Tuen Ma Line respectively:

==== Tseung Kwan O Extension ====
The Tseung Kwan O Extension was deemed to be necessary as the population of the New Town continued to grow closer to the point where the construction of the line would be considered economically viable. The line was proposed to run from the existing Lam Tin station to Tseung Kwan O with stations at Yau Tong, Tiu Keng Leng, Tseung Kwan O, Hang Hau and Po Lam, with a possible extension from Lam Tin to Ma Tau Kok considered.

The extension from Lam Tin to Ma Tau Kok was also mentioned in the 1993 South East Kowloon Development Statement, where it was deemed to be an integral part of the land reclamation and redevelopment plans of the land surrounding the soon-to-be decommissioned Kai Tak Airport. The line would have run from Lam Tin through the newly reclaimed area with two intermediate stations to Ma Tau Kok, where the line would have met the proposed second section of the East Kowloon Route. It was unclear as to whether it would have run further along to stations on the Kowloon Peninsula or it would have terminated at Ma Tau Kok.

==== East Kowloon Route ====
The East Kowloon Route consisted of two schemes. The first section was proposed to run from Ma On Shan to Tai Wai, where there would be an interchange with the KCR, and then to Diamond Hill, where there would be an interchange with the MTR. The second section would be an MTR line running from Diamond Hill through South East Kowloon to Hung Hom to interchange with the KCR, through to Tsim Sha Tsui to interchange with the MTR Tsuen Wan Line, and terminating at West Kowloon where it would meet the Airport Railway. It was unclear as to whether the two sections would have run as one single line or not. The scheme was deemed to be economically unviable due to low estimated patronage and expensive construction costs. Construction of the route would necessitate substantial financial assistance from either the Government or the public sector.

==== Improvements to KCR Stations ====
The study recommended improvements to passenger circulation in KCR stations, additional entrance/exit points and extra escalators to solve the capacity problems experienced during peak hours, notably at the Kowloon Tong interchange between the KCR and the MTR.

=== Hong Kong Island Lines ===
The Hong Kong Island Lines consisted of 3 projects, which evolved into South Island Line, North Island Line plans and West Island Line Extension respectively:

==== South Hong Kong Island Line ====
The South Hong Kong Island Line was recommended to run as an Intermediate Capacity System linking Aberdeen, Ap Lei Chau, Telegraph Bay, Wah Fu and Wong Chuk Hang with Admiralty. The route was deemed to be of low priority as the planned road network would be sufficient for the estimated traffic demands.

==== North Hong Kong Island Line ====
The North Hong Kong Island Line was recommended to run as an Intermediate Capacity System as the transport demand on the future Central and Wanchai reclamation could justify the construction of the line. The line was proposed to run from the Airport Railway station at Central to Tin Hau, with an interchange with the South Hong Kong Island Line at Admiralty.

==== West Hong Kong Island Line ====
The West Hong Kong Island Line was an extension of the Island Line from Sheung Wan via Kennedy Town to the planned Green Island reclamation. The extension to Kennedy Town alone was determined to be economically unviable nor necessary and the extension was dependent on the development of the Green Island reclamation.

=== Long Term Proposals ===
The Long Term Schemes proposed by Railway Development Study comprised rail links to connect Tin Shui Wai, Tuen Mun, Yam O and Green Island. These links would collectively form an "Outer" Western Corridor. Other schemes for longer-term development included a second Port Rail Line to the Lantau Port. These schemes are related to long term reclamation proposals and future land and port development. No dates for construction were proposed but in view of their strategic importance, the study recommended that their route alignments should be protected.

== Railway Development Strategy (1994) ==
The proposals from the Railway Development Study were then evaluated and further refined in Railway Development Strategy.

=== Western Corridor ===
==== Port Rail Line ====
No changes to plans made in Railway Development Study except for an additional plan for a train marshalling and freight handling facility located near Fanling.

==== Cross Border Passenger Service ====
The location of the passenger terminal was now proposed to be adjacent to West Kowloon station of the Airport Railway instead of the original location near Tai Kok Tsui. It was also recommended that the second border crossing should be constructed first as a branch of the KCR line from Sheung Shui to Lok Ma Chau to provide early relief for the Lo Wu crossing.

==== Sub-Regional Passenger Service ====
The Sub-Regional Passenger Service was extended from the original terminus at Tin Shui Wai to Tuen Mun North, with possible plans to further extend to Tuen Mun Town Centre at a later date. An interchange with the MTR Tsuen Wan Line is now proposed to be at Mei Foo or Kwai Fong instead of the original plans for an extension to Tsuen King Circuit. The service would have terminated at West Kowloon where passengers would have been able to interchange with the new Airport Railway. It was unclear as to whether the service would have been a branch of or completely separated from the Airport Railway.

=== Eastern Corridor ===
==== Tseung Kwan O Extension ====
The Tseung Kwan O extension was cut short from the original plans to extend from Lam Tin to Ma Tau Kok and now terminates at the existing Lam Tin station instead. Further study was recommended for the Kwun Tong Line to extend from Quarry Bay to Tin Hau to relieve congestion, where it would have met and possibly connected with the proposed North Hong Kong Island Line as later proposals would suggest.

==== East Kowloon Route ====
The East Kowloon Route was split into three separate schemes: a Ma On Shan to Tai Wai Link, a Diamond Hill to Hung Hom Link, and a KCR extension to Tsim Sha Tsui and later West Kowloon. The Ma On Shan to Tai Wai Link and the Diamond Hill to Hung Hom Link were suggested to be Intermediate Capacity Systems like the Hong Kong Island Lines. The Ma On Shan to Tai Wai Link is recommended to be constructed at around the same time as the KCR extension and the Diamond Hill to Hung Hom Link is dependent on the scale of development of the land surrounding the soon-to-be decommissioned Kai Tak Airport, as seen in 1993 South East Kowloon Development Statement.

==== Improvements to KCR Stations ====
No changes to plans made in Railway Development Study.

=== Hong Kong Island Lines ===
==== South Hong Kong Island Line ====
No changes to plans made in Railway Development Study.

==== North Hong Kong Island Line ====
The type of rail system used in North Hong Kong Island Line was now dependent on the form and density of the development on the Central and Wanchai reclamation. It was unclear as to whether the line would have been independent or run as an extension of the Kwun Tong Line as later proposals would suggest.

==== West Hong Kong Island Line ====
No changes to plans made in Railway Development Study.

=== Long Term Proposals ===
No changes to plans made in Railway Development Study except for the exclusion of the Yuen Long to Tuen Mun North Link as it was now included in the Western Corridor scheme.

== Priorities and Implementation ==
=== Group A ===
The Group A projects are those railway proposals which are accorded highest priority. They are needed to provide relief for critical transport corridors or to serve committed developments, and are economically viable. The projects to be included in Group A are:

- The Western Corridor comprising the Port Rail Line, the Cross Border Passenger Service and the Sub-regional Passenger Service, including an extension to Tuen Mun North.
- The MTR Tseung Kwan O Extension
- The East Kowloon Route - KCR extension from Hung Hom to Tsim Sha Tsui and a railway from Ma On Shan to Tai Wai.

The three projects above are proposed to be implemented by 2001. The actual construction and commissioning programme will be established after completion of detailed implementation studies.

=== Group B ===
The Group B projects are those railway proposals which are at present less urgent in terms of transport need and whose implementation depends on land use and infrastructure development. Because of the present uncertainty surrounding these schemes, it would be pre-mature to set firm target dates for their implementation. They will be kept under close review and implementation will be considered once the uncertainty is removed. Recommended schemes classified as Group B projects, together with factors affecting their implementation priority, are described below

- Extension of NWNT Sub-regional Passenger Service from Tuen Mun North to Tuen Mun Central: With the NWNT passenger line now planned for extension to Tuen Mun North, Tuen Mun residents would be able to make use of the system with reasonable ease using the LRT as a feeder service. Further extension of the line from Tuen Mun North to Tuen Mun Central would depend on population build up in Tuen Mun, and the capacity of the LRT as a feeder and of the proposed LRT/NWNT line interchange at Tuen Mun North. The probable alignment of this further extension would require further study from the environmental and engineering standpoints.
- East Kowloon Route - KCR Extension from Tsim Sha Tsui to West Kowloon: Possible further extension of the KCR main line from Tsim Sha Tsui to West Kowloon would depend on the implementation of the proposed Kowloon Point reclamation.
- East Kowloon Route - ICS from Diamond Hill to Hung Hom: This will depend on the scale and programme for development for Southeast Kowloon Reclamation and the former Kai Tak site.
- South HK Island Line: The planned road system should have the capacity to meet forecast transport demands. Population growth in the area, as well as the programme for the Route 7 trunk road from Western District to Aberdeen, will have a bearing on the timing of the project.
- West HK Island Line including extension to Green Island: This project will depend on the scale and timing of development of the proposed Green Island reclamation.
- North HK Island Line: This project will depend on the development programme for the Central and Wanchai reclamation

=== Group C ===
The Group C projects are essentially proposals which depend on longer term land and port developments. Though the need for these proposals has yet to be firmly established in all cases, they are considered to be logical extensions of the railway system. It is necessary at this stage to reserve land for these projects (as well as those in Groups A and B) so as to ensure that their future implementation will not be frustrated by other developments. Like the Group B projects, these projects will be kept under review and considered for implementation when justified. Proposals classified as Group C projects are -

- The "Outer" Western Corridor - Tuen Mun to Yam O Link, Yam O to Green Island Link; and
- The second Port Rail Line to Lantau Port
