= Metroplaza =

Shopping centre in Kwai Fong, Hong Kong

Coordinates: 22°21′27″N 114°07′35″E

- 新都會廣場

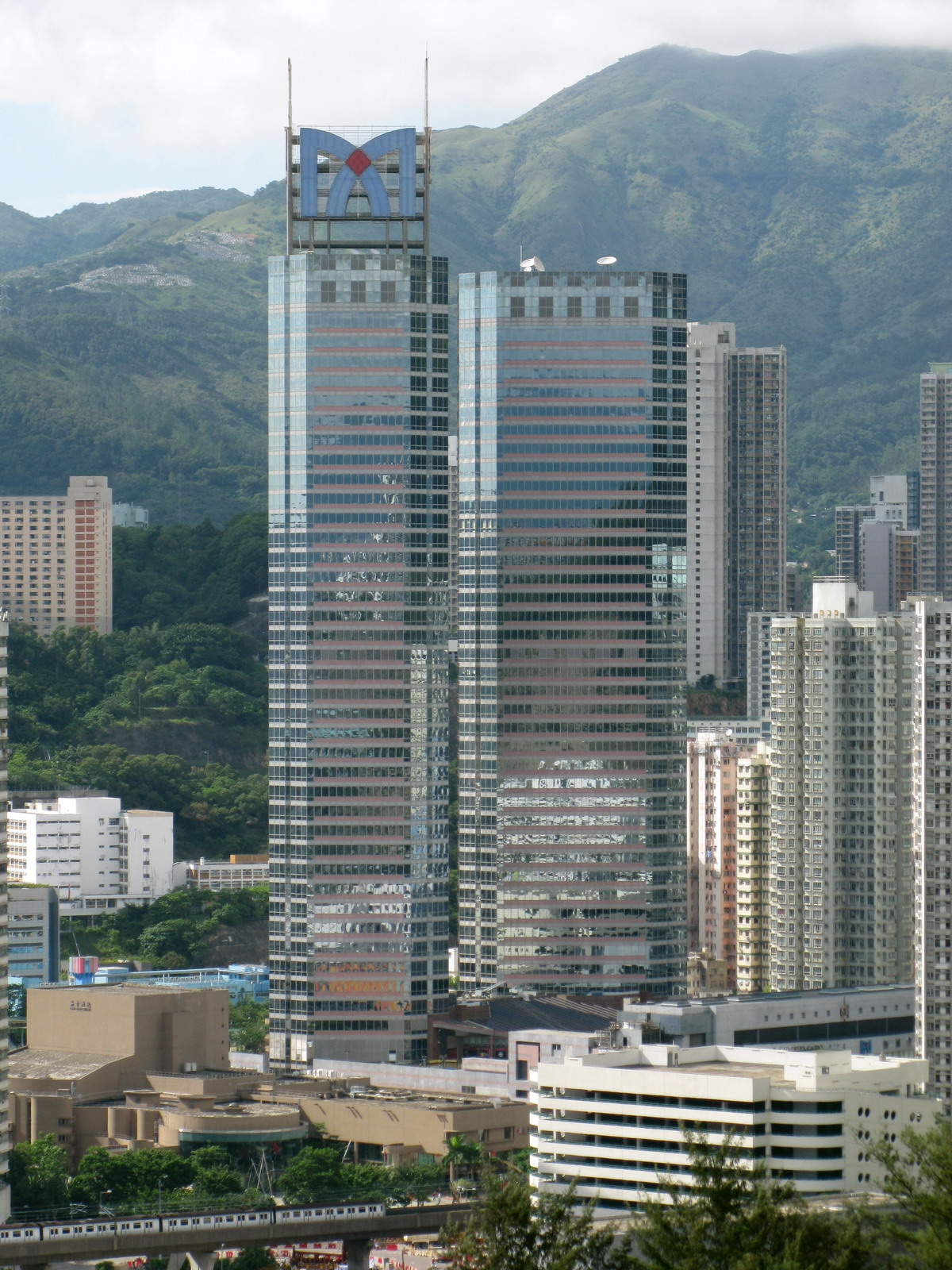
- Metroplaza office building
- Location: Kwai Chung, New Territories, Hong Kong
- Address: 223 Hing Fong Road, Kwai Chung, New Territories, Hong Kong
- Opened: January 1993; 33 years ago
- Developer: Sun Hung Kai Properties
- Public transit: MTR Tsuen Wan line Kwai Fong station

Metroplaza
- Traditional Chinese: 新都會廣場
- Simplified Chinese: 新都会广场
Transcriptions
Standard Mandarin
- Hanyu Pinyin: Xīndūhuì Guǎngchǎng
Yue: Cantonese
- Jyutping: san1 dou1 wui5 gwong2 coeng4

Metroplaza (Chinese: 新都會廣場) is a shopping centre and office building developed by Sun Hung Kai Properties, officially opened in January 1993. It is located in Kwai Fong, Hong Kong and is opposite to Kwai Fong station of MTR. The mall is a shopping hub of adjacent areas of Kwai Fong, Lai King, Tsing Yi and Kwai Chung. While Metroplaza provides spacious shopping environment, another shopping centre Kwai Chung Plaza adjoining offers varieties of small shops. The mall had undergone major renovation from 2014 to November 2017.

The mall is adjacent to Kwai Tsing Theatre.

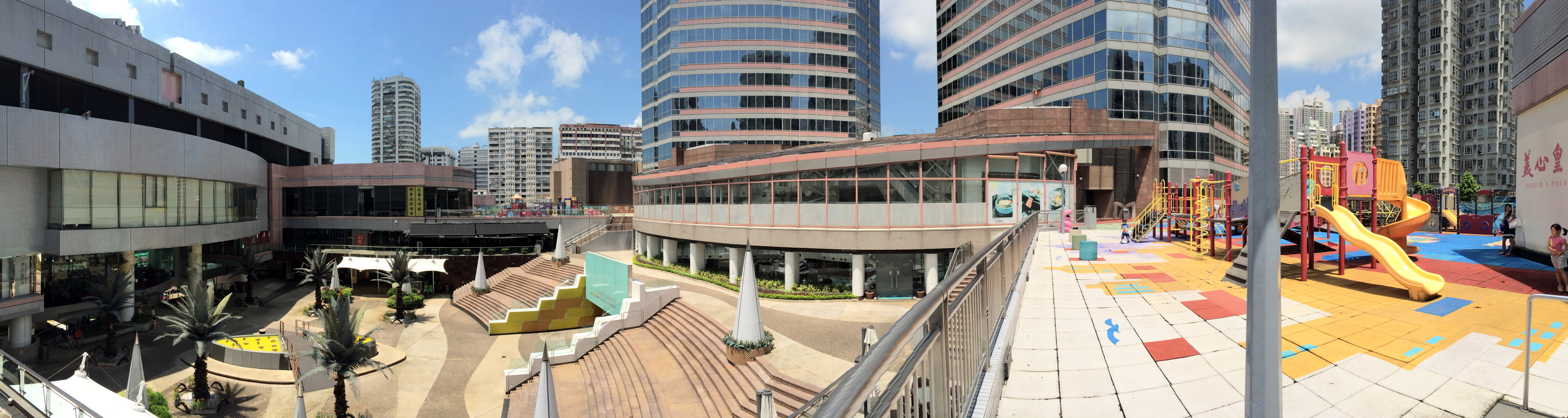
Plaza on Level 3 and Playground on Level 5 before renovation in 2014

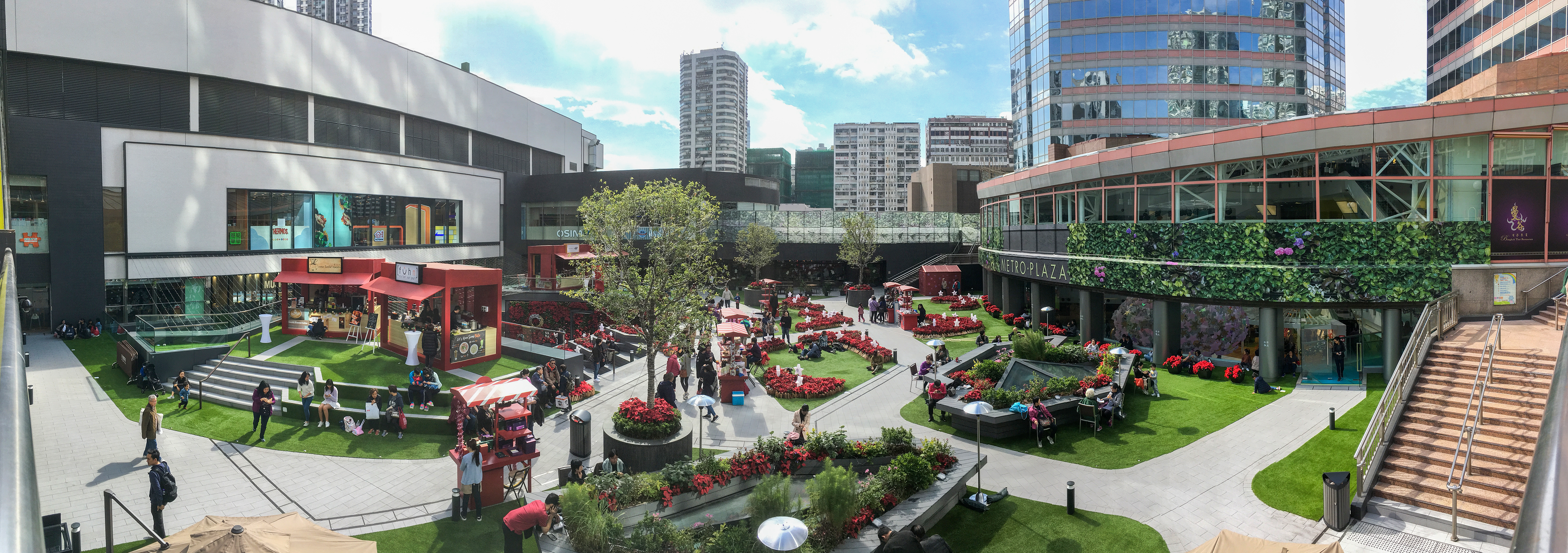
New Plaza on Level 4

== Metroplaza Office Towers ==
The two Metroplaza Towers, are the tallest in the area of Kwai Fong and are therefore the landmarks of the area.

The towers are situated above the shopping centre. MetroPlaza Tower 2 is the taller of the two towers, rising 47 floors and 209 metres (686 ft) to the top of its decorative spire and logo. The building was completed in 1992. It was designed by architectural firm Wong Tung & Partners, and was developed by Sun Hung Kai Properties. MetroPlaza Tower 2, which stands as the 41st-tallest building in Hong Kong, is composed entirely of commercial office space. The building is an example of postmodern architecture.

MetroPlaza Tower 1 has the same roof height and floor count as MetroPlaza Tower 2, but is significantly shorter due to the absence of a spire; the building does not even rank among the 100 tallest structures in the city. The tower rises 47 floors and 174 metres (571 ft) in height.

Tenants include: 16th Floor: Texwinca Holdings (德永佳實業有限公司), the parent company of Baleno

== Gallery ==
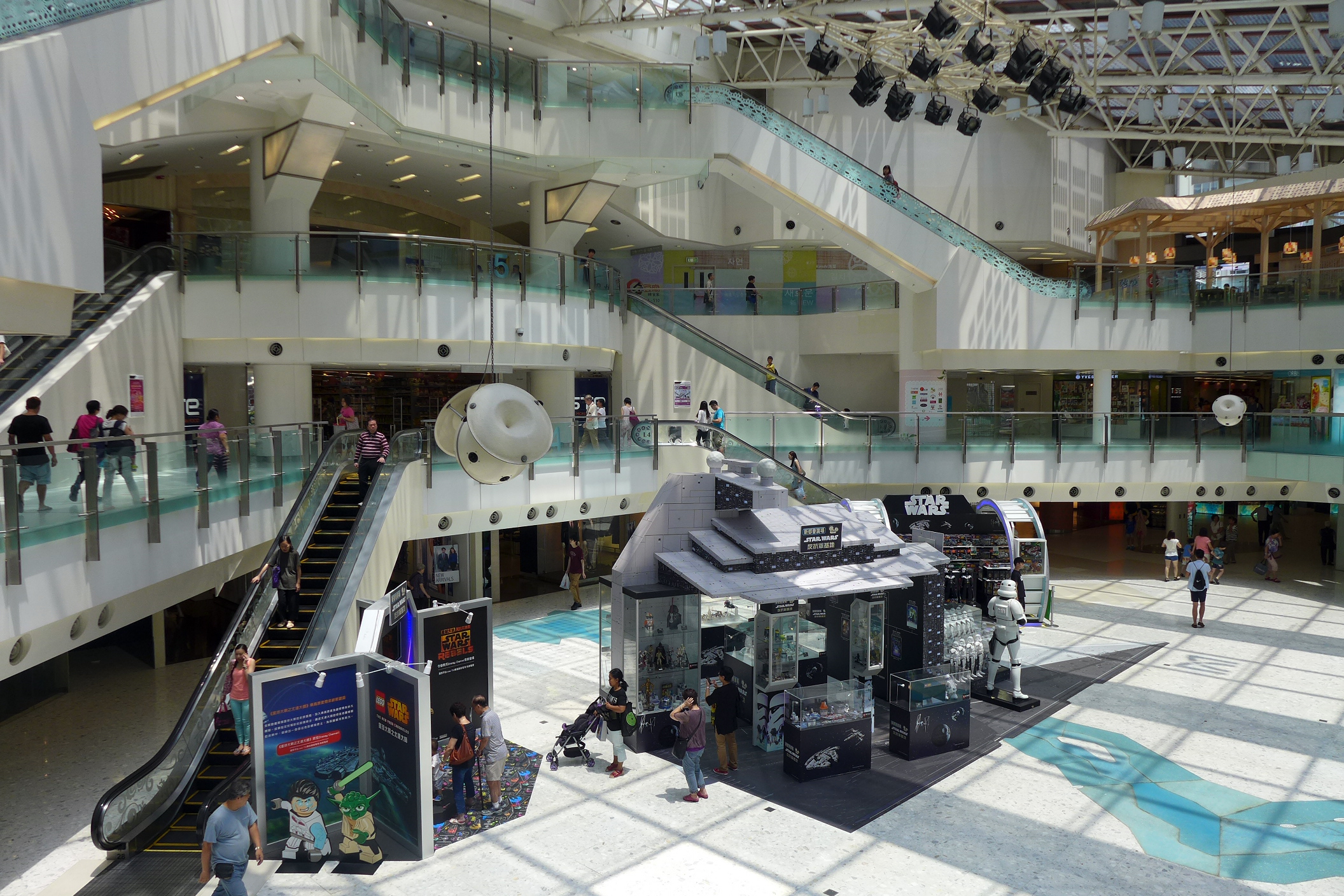
Metroplaza shopping centre Atrium

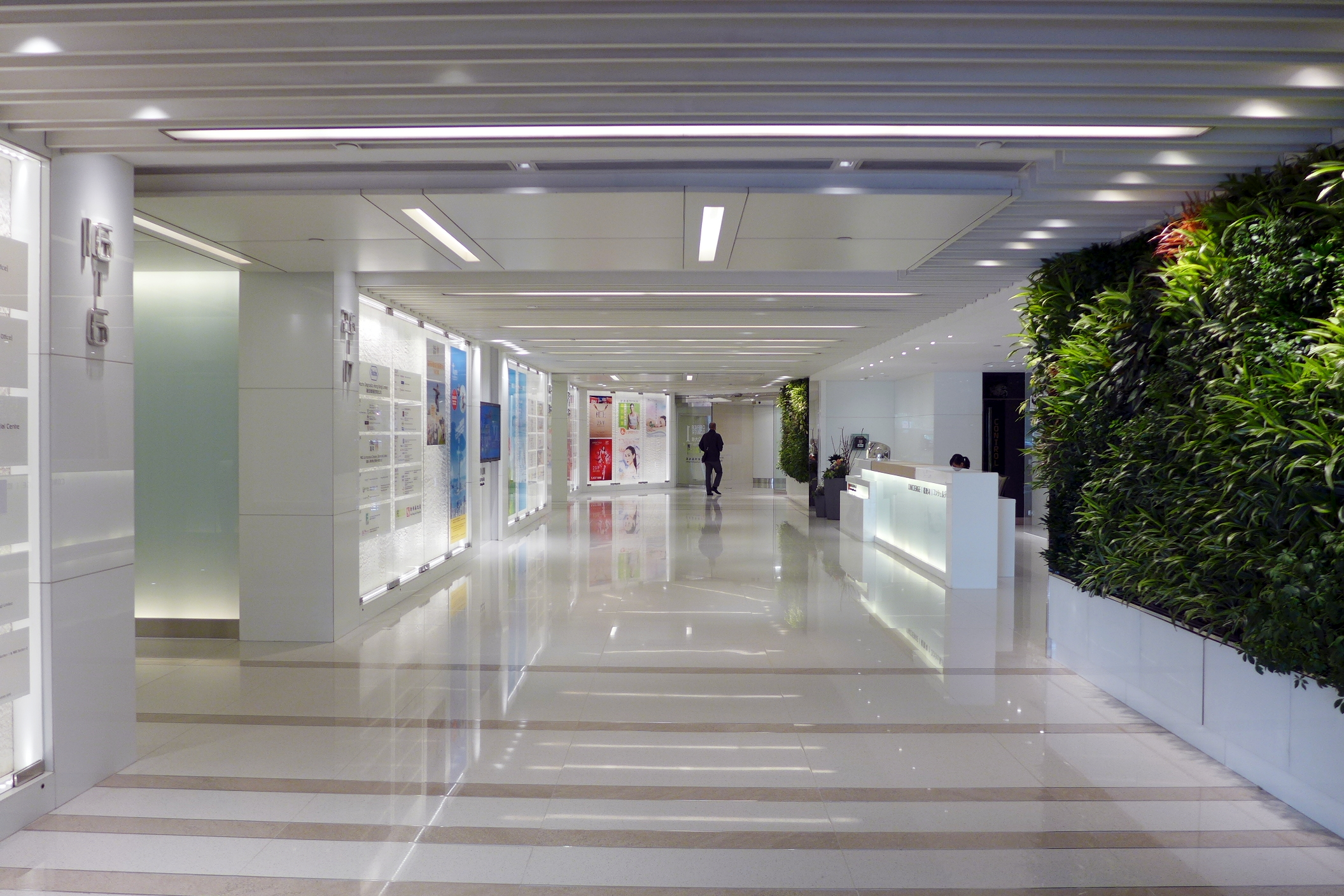
Metroplaza Office Lobby

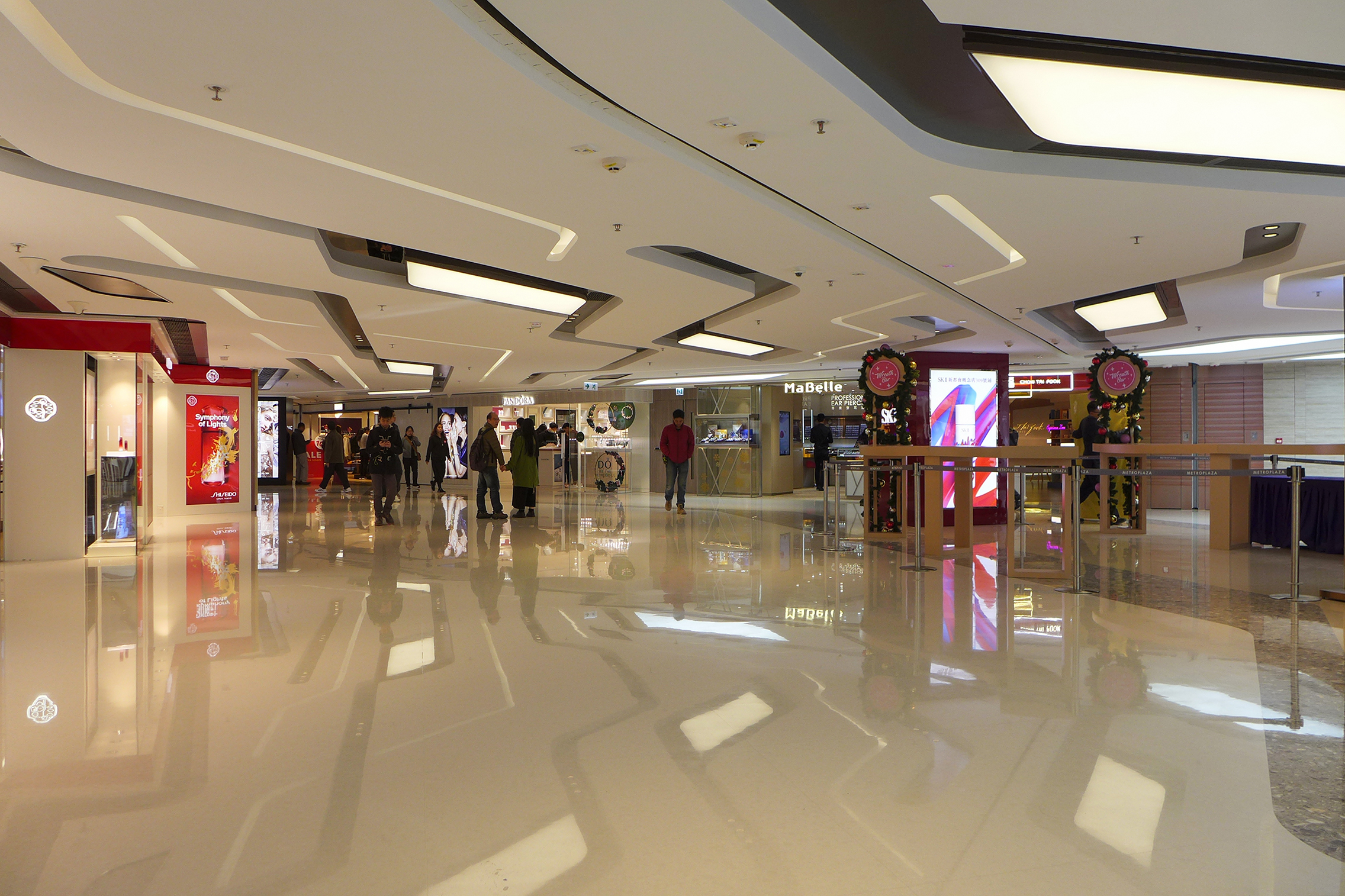
Shops in Level 3

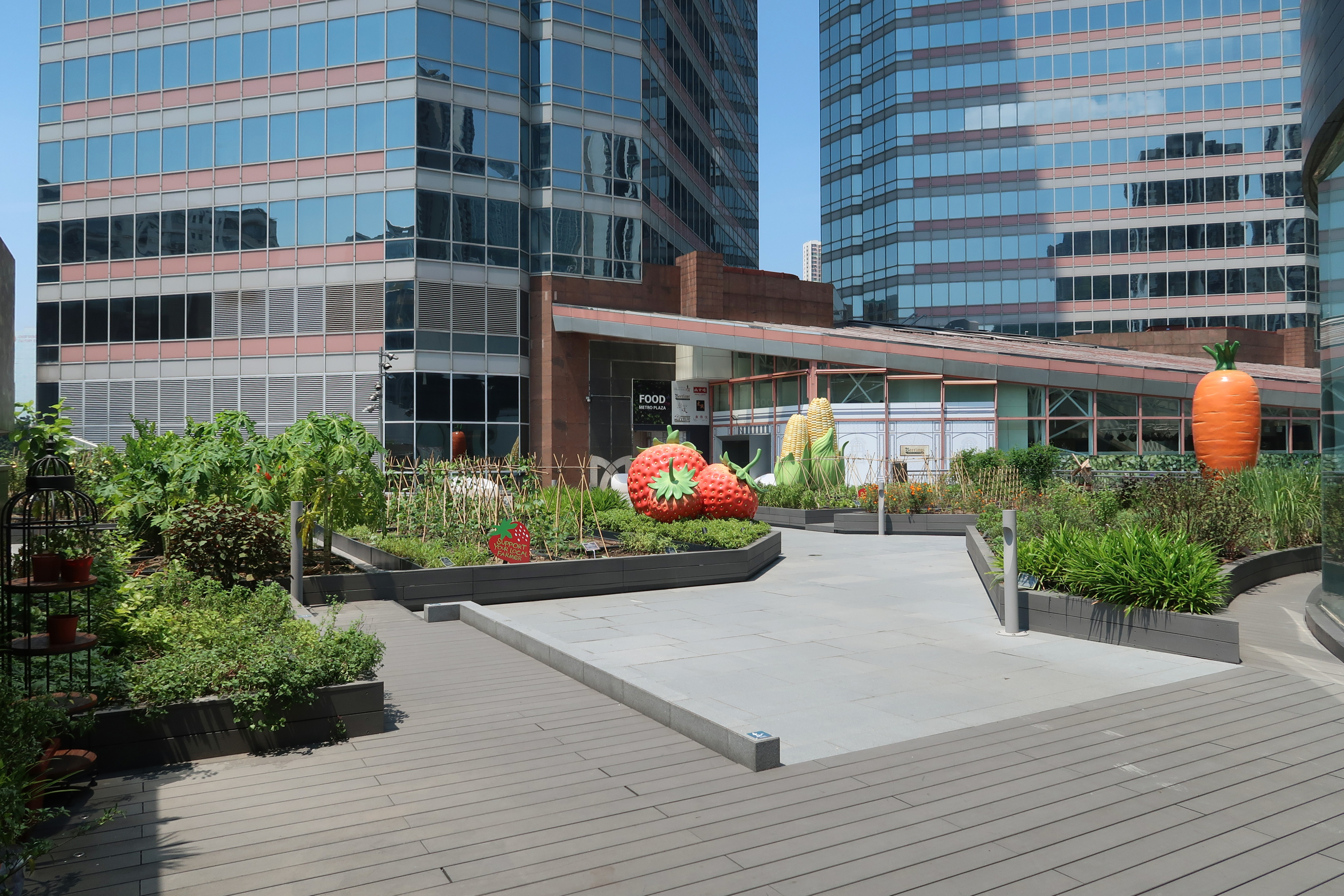
Urban Farm on MetroPlaza Level 5

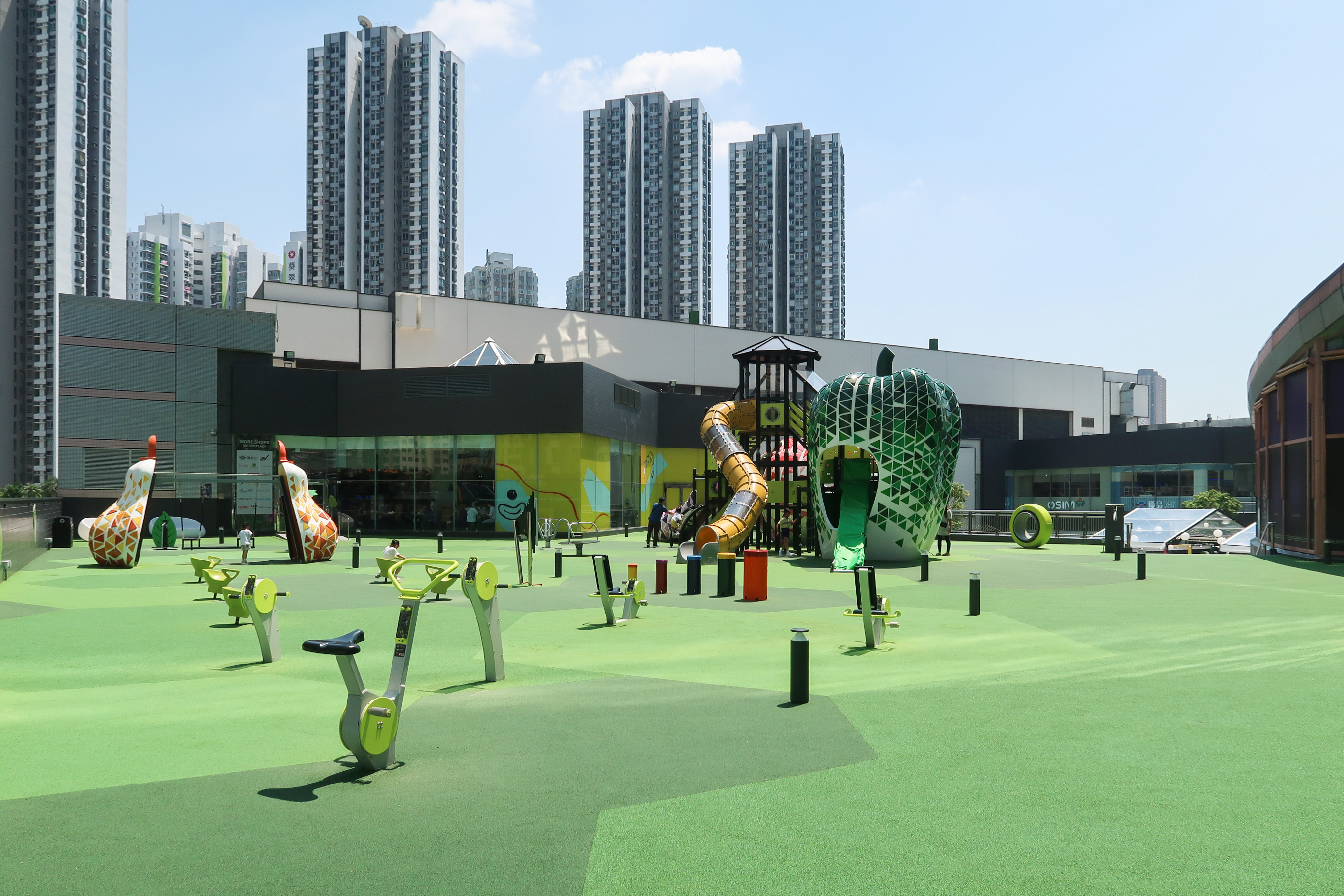
Children Play Area on MetroPlaza Level 5

== See also ==
- List of tallest buildings in Hong Kong
