= Kwai Hing station =

MTR station in the New Territories, Hong Kong

Kwai Hing 葵興
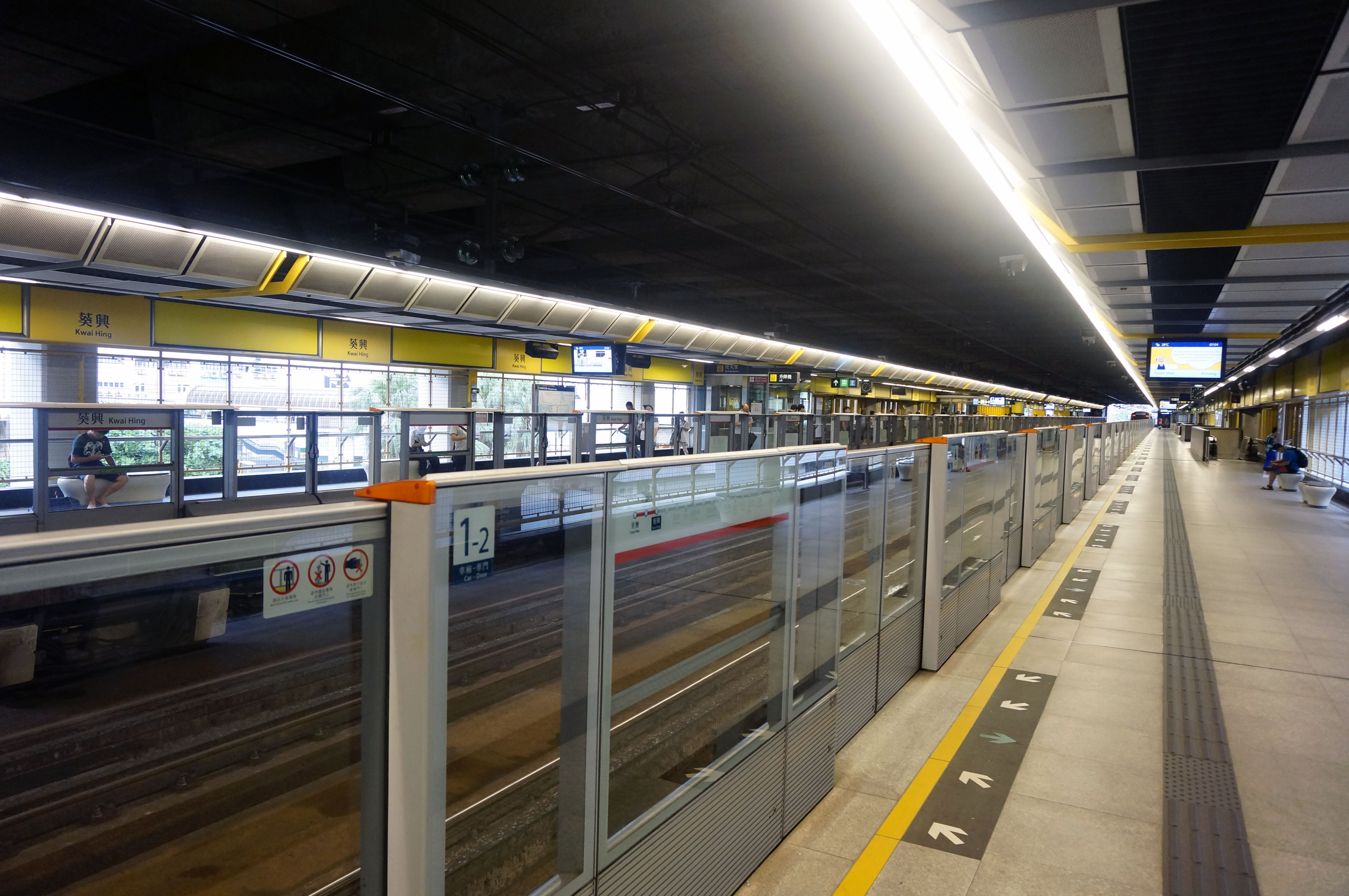
- Platform 1 of Kwai Hing station

Chinese name
- Traditional Chinese: 葵興
- Simplified Chinese: 葵兴
- Hanyu Pinyin: Kuíxīng
- Cantonese Yale: Kwàihīng
- Literal meaning: Florish Palm
Transcriptions
Standard Mandarin
- Hanyu Pinyin: Kuíxīng
Yue: Cantonese
- Yale Romanization: Kwàihīng
- Jyutping: Kwai4hing1

General information
- Location: Kwai Hing Road, Kwai Chung; Kwai Tsing District; Hong Kong
- Coordinates: 22°21′48″N 114°07′52″E
- System: MTR rapid transit station
- Owner: MTR office
- Operator: MTR Corporation
- Line: Tsuen Wan line
- Platforms: 2 side platforms
- Tracks: 2
- Connections: Bus, minibus

Construction
- Structure type: Elevated
- Platform levels: 1
- Accessible: yes

Other information
- Station code: KWH

History
- Opened: 17 May 1982; 44 years ago
- Former names: Kwai Chung

Services
Preceding station	MTR	Following station
Kwai Fong towards Central	Tsuen Wan line	Tai Wo Hau towards Tsuen Wan
Track layout
Location
- Location within MTR

Kwai Hing (Chinese: 葵興) is an MTR station on the Tsuen Wan line. It is named after the nearest public housing estate, and is located above ground between Kwai Fong and Tai Wo Hau stations. Opened on 10 May 1982, its lineage is bright yellow.

Its opening caused most direct bus services into Kowloon to be cancelled. Nevertheless, the station provides a convenient transport service to local residents, also attracting local shuttle services with nearby settlements and factories.

Below the platforms is a small transport interchange. This interchange is saturated with traffic, due to traffic diverted from the increasingly crowded Kwai Fong station.

== History ==
Kwai Hing station opened on 10 May 1982, in sync with Tsuen Wan line. The construction of Kwai Fong station, this station, and the viaducts was done by Dragages et Travaux Publics. There has been no new changes since, other than the fitting of Automatic Platform Gates.

== Station layout ==
U1; Platforms	Exit E	Exit, footbridge to Kowloon Commerce Centre
U1; Platforms	Side platform, doors will open on the left
U1; Platforms	Platform 2	Tsuen Wan line towards Central (Kwai Fong) →
U1; Platforms	Platform 1	← Tsuen Wan line towards Tsuen Wan (Tai Wo Hau)
U1; Platforms	Side platform, doors will open on the left
G	Concourse	Exits, transport interchange
G	Concourse	Customer services, MTRshops
G	Concourse	Hang Seng Bank, vending machines, automatic teller machines

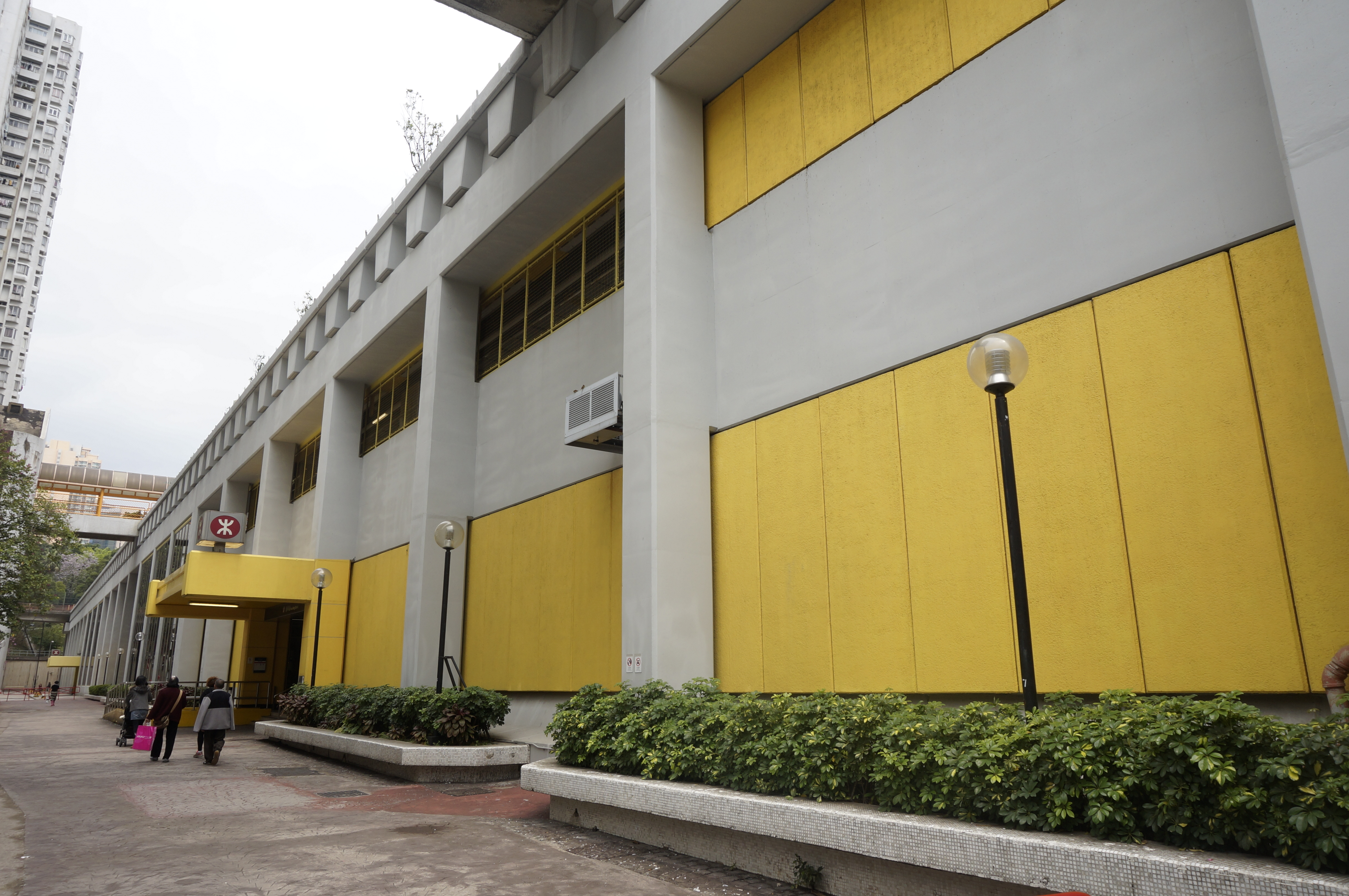
Exterior view of Kwai Hing station

The tracks of platform 1 and 2 are located side by side in the middle of the station. Unlike the island platforms common to most MTR stations, Kwai Hing uses two side platforms and passengers have to ride different escalators from the concourse up to the correct platform for the destination they wish to go to.

Kwai Hing station is one of the three elevated stations on the Tsuen Wan line. (The others are Lai King and Kwai Fong stations.) The structure of Kwai Hing station is very similar to that of Kwai Fong station.

== Entrances/Exits ==
- A: Kwai Hing Estate, Kwai Hing Road, Millennium Trade Centre, Kwai Chung Centre, Kwai Chun Court
- B: Transport Interchange, Kwai Hing Government Offices
- C: Kwai Hong Court
- D: Sun Kwai Hing Gardens
- E: Kowloon Commerce Centre
