= Kwai Chung Plaza =

Building in Kwai Tsing District, Hong Kong

Coordinates: 22°21′27″N 114°07′40″E

- 葵涌廣場
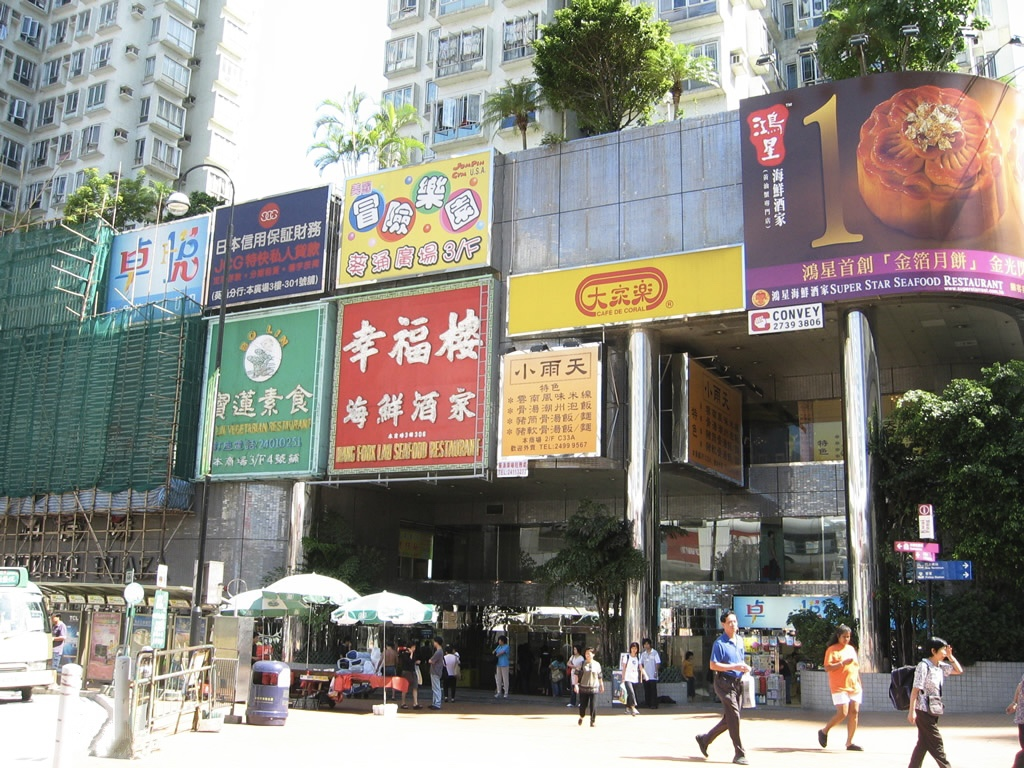
- Main Entrance of Kwai Chung Plaza
- Location: Kwai Chung, New Territories, Hong Kong
- Address: 7 – 11 Hing Fong Road, Kwai Chung, New Territories, Hong Kong
- Opened: 1990; 36 years ago
- Developer: Nan Fung Group
- Floors: G/F, 1/F, 2/F, 3/F
- Public transit: MTR Tsuen Wan line Kwai Fong station

Kwai Chung Plaza
- Traditional Chinese: 葵涌廣場
- Simplified Chinese: 葵涌广场
Transcriptions
Standard Mandarin
- Hanyu Pinyin: Kuíchōng Guǎngchǎng
Yue: Cantonese
- Jyutping: kwai4 cung1 gwong2 coeng4

Kwai Chung Plaza (葵涌廣場) is a private housing estate and shopping centre located in the Kwai Tsing District at 7 – 11 Hing Fong Road, Kwai Chung, New Territories, Hong Kong. It is adjacent to Kwai Fong Estate, Metroplaza and Kwai Fong station of MTR.

The plaza comprises residential and sellable areas. There are 640 units for dwelling in 3 blocks, Block 1 and Block 2 with 27 floors, and Block 3 with 26 floors. The plaza provides 318 to 1,079 square feet of space for shopping. The shopping centre houses numerous small shops providing various services. It contains restaurants, department stores, clinics, retails for clothing, specialities, groceries, sundry goods, and small business shops.

== History ==
The site where the plaza is located now was previously the Kwai Fong Temporary Housing Area. The temporary housing area was cleared and further developed into Kwai Chung Plaza by Nan Fung Group in 1990.

== Location ==
Kwai Chung Plaza is located in the Kwai Tsing District at 7 – 11 Hing Fong Road, and is connected to MetroPlaza, Kwai Chung Sports Ground, and Kwai Fong Estate by footbridge.

Kwai Chung Plaza is located in the Kwai Chung district of Hong Kong, near Kwai Shing East Estate. There are several transport stops at Kwai Chung Plaza Blocks, the main one being Kwai Fong MTR Station, followed by several smaller stops. Although most of the residential buildings in Kwai Chung Plaza have podium gardens, these gardens are not connected to the transport stops in this area, so residents cannot reach the podium gardens directly from the MTR station. The residential area of Kwai Chung Plaza Blocks is characterised by their lower position than the podium gardens, which separate the residents from the public.

Roads are in all directions connected by bus stations, and Kwai Fong station is on the southeast side of the plaza. The plaza is surrounded by residential areas, playgrounds, parks, commercial complexes, schools and colleges
