= Kwai Fong station =

MTR station in the New Territories, Hong Kong

Kwai Fong 葵芳
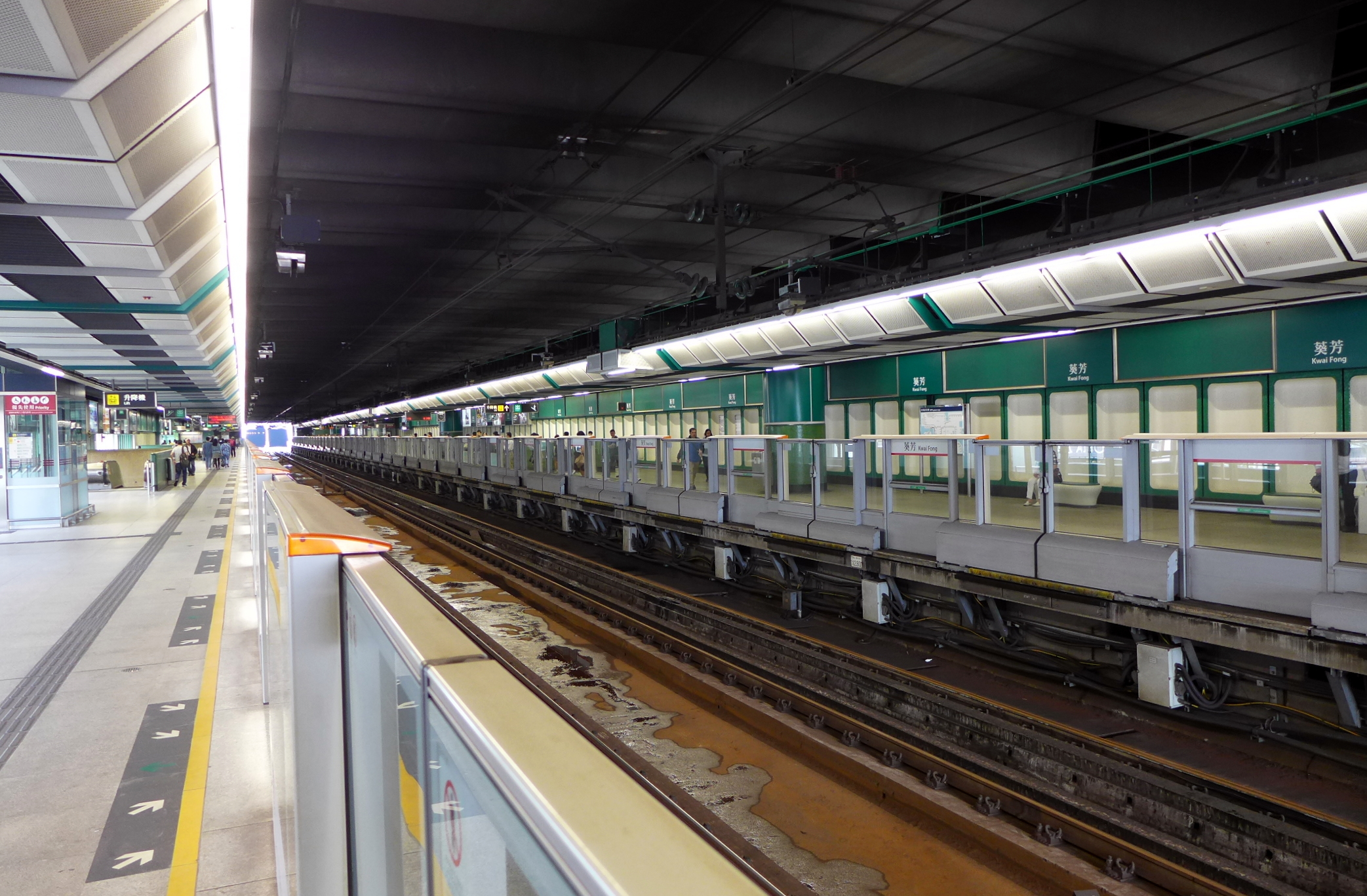
- Platform of Kwai Fong station

Chinese name
- Chinese: 葵芳
- Hanyu Pinyin: Kuífāng
- Cantonese Yale: Kwàifōng
- Literal meaning: Scented Palm
Transcriptions
Standard Mandarin
- Hanyu Pinyin: Kuífāng
Yue: Cantonese
- Yale Romanization: Kwàifōng
- Jyutping: Kwai4fong1

General information
- Location: Kwai Yan Road, Kwai Chung; Kwai Tsing District; Hong Kong
- Coordinates: 22°21′25″N 114°07′40″E
- System: MTR rapid transit station
- Owner: MTR Corporation
- Operator: MTR Corporation
- Line: Tsuen Wan line
- Platforms: 2 (2 side platforms)
- Tracks: 2
- Connections: Bus, minibus

Construction
- Structure type: Elevated
- Platform levels: 1
- Accessible: yes

Other information
- Station code: KWF

History
- Opened: 17 May 1982; 44 years ago

Services
Preceding station	MTR	Following station
Lai King towards Central	Tsuen Wan line	Kwai Hing towards Tsuen Wan
Track layout
Location
- Location within MTR

Kwai Fong (Chinese: 葵芳) is an MTR station on the Tsuen Wan line. Opened on 10 May 1982, it is located above ground between Lai King and Kwai Hing stations. Its lineage is dark green.

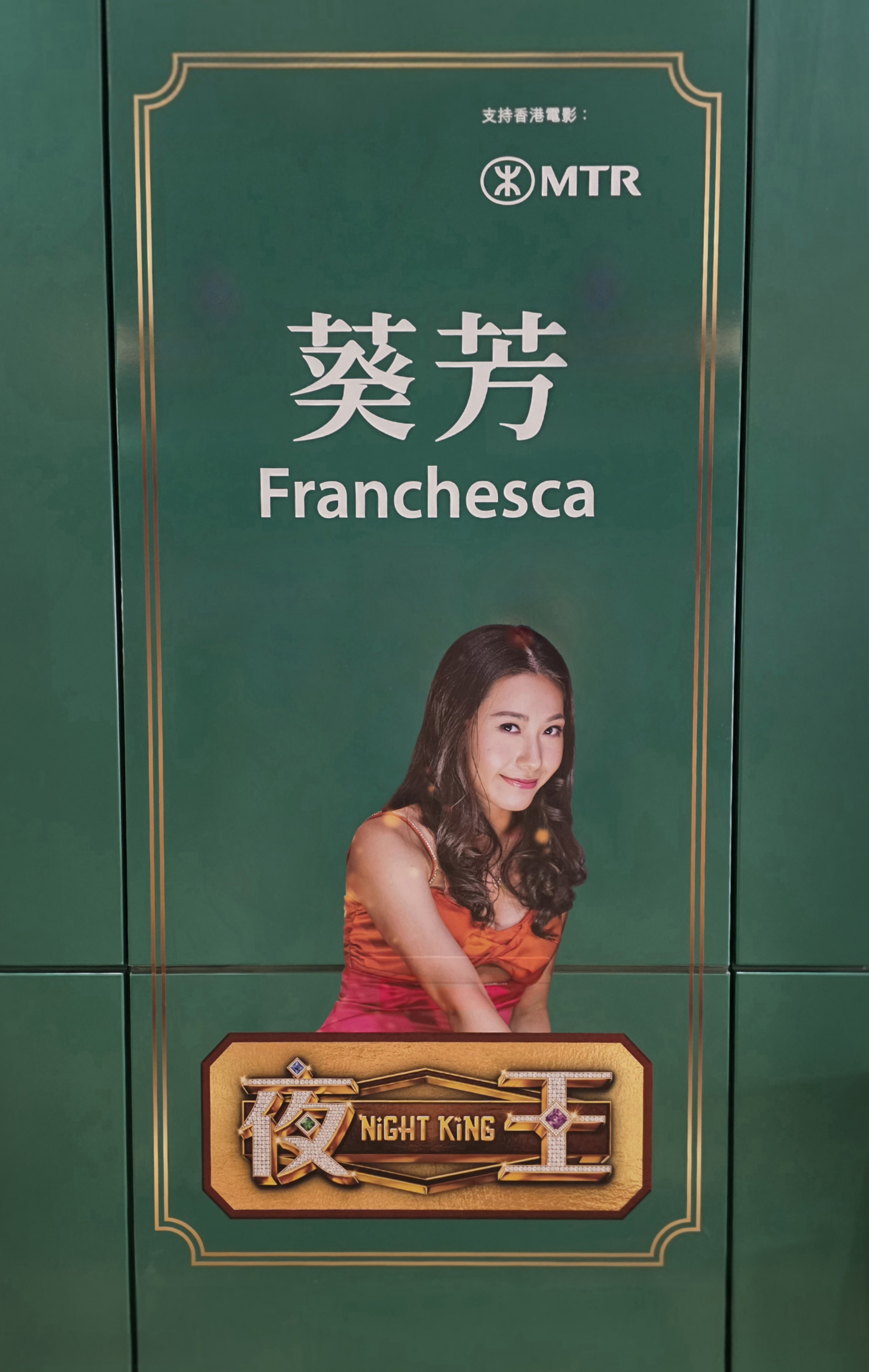
Kwai Fong Station nickname Franchesca poster during the movie Night King promo

Named after Kwai Fong Estate, a large public housing estate to its northeast, Kwai Fong, the neighbourhood around the station, has become a transit interchange, business centre, as well as the landmark area of Kwai Chung. Since opening, all sorts of road transportation from various places in the Kwai Tsing District have converged here. A shopping centre (Metroplaza) was also built west of the station in the early 1990s. The station also serves those who work in the factories to its east.

The tracks north of the station are surrounded by concrete noise barriers to minimise noise pollution for residents living near the railway.

== History ==
Kwai Fong station was built as part of the Tsuen Wan Extension project, the first extension of the MTR system following its 1979 opening. The new line served to link the Tsuen Wan New Town to Kowloon. It opened on 10 May 1982. The contract for the construction of this station, Kwai Hing station, and the viaducts was awarded and built by Dragages et Travaux Publics.

Automatic platform gates were installed at this station in August 2011.

== Station layout ==
U1; Platforms	Side platform, doors will open on the left
U1; Platforms	Platform 2	Tsuen Wan line towards Central (Lai King) →
U1; Platforms	Platform 1	← Tsuen Wan line towards Tsuen Wan (Kwai Hing)
U1; Platforms	Side platform, doors will open on the left
U1; Platforms	Exit E	Exit, footbridge to Metroplaza
G	Concourse	Exits, transport interchange
G	Concourse	Customer services, MTRshops
G	Concourse	Hang Seng Bank, vending machines, automatic teller machines
G	Concourse	Octopus promotion machine

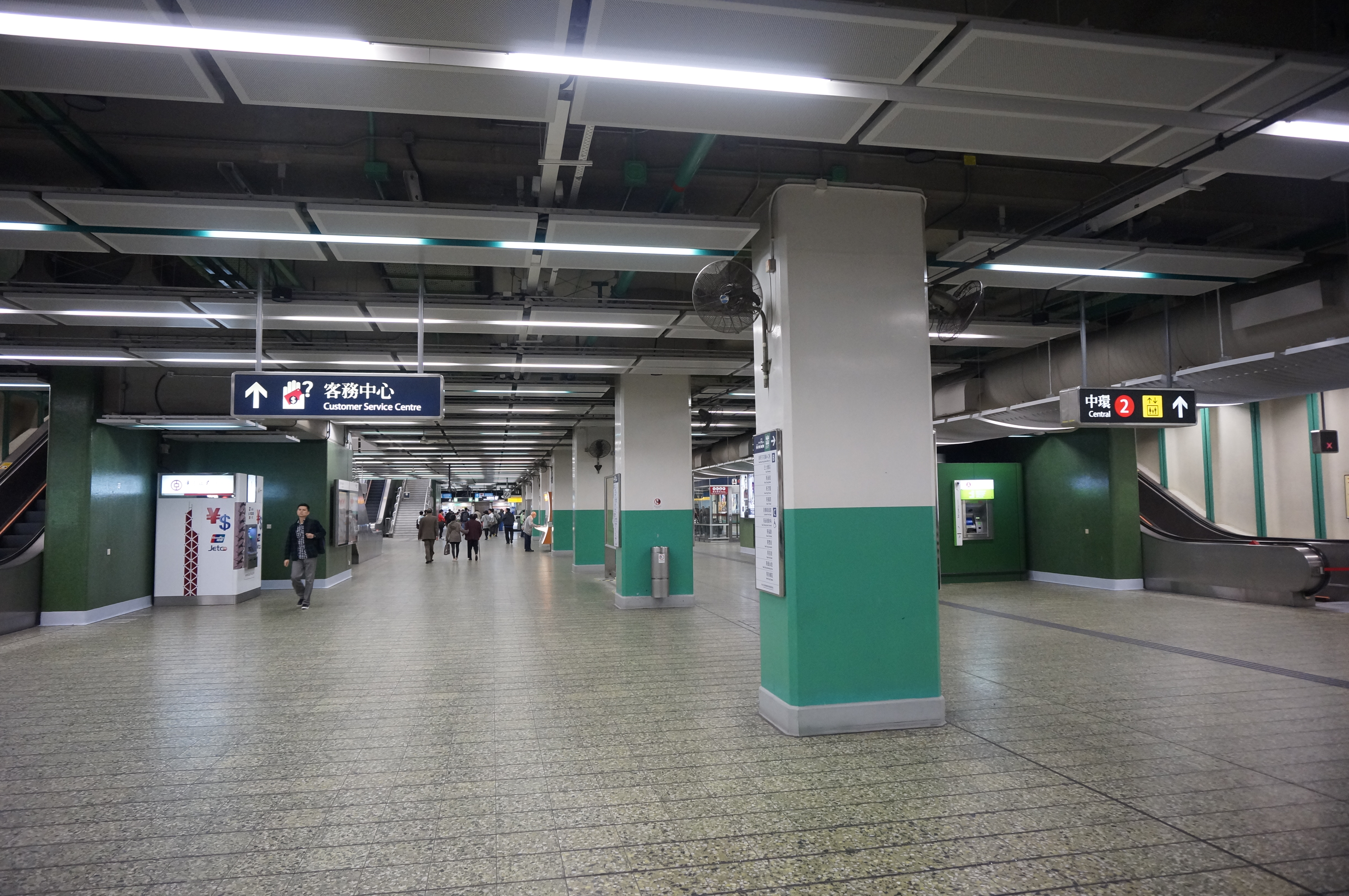
Kwai Fong station Concourse

The tracks of platform 1 and 2 are located next to each other in the middle of the station. Passengers have to ride different escalators up as according to the platform they want to go to.

Kwai Fong station is one of the three elevated stations of the Tsuen Wan line. (The others are Lai King and Kwai Hing stations.)

The structure of Kwai Fong station is very similar to Kwai Hing station.

Passengers can go to Exit E from Platform 1 without going down any escalators, but for Platform 2, passengers should take an escalator down to the concourse, and take an escalator back to Platform 1, and go to Exit E. From Exit E to the platform, it is the same as the above.

== Entrances/Exits ==
- A: New Kwai Fong Gardens D-E, Kwai Fong Estate
- B: New Kwai Fong Gardens A-C
- C: Kwai Tsing Theatre
- D: Kwai Chung Plaza, Metroplaza (ground level)
- E: Metroplaza (via footbridge linking Platform 1)

Exits A through D are located at the ground floor of the station, while Exit E is located on Platform 1 (towards Tsuen Wan).
