= Kwai Fong =

- Chinese: 葵芳
Transcriptions
Standard Mandarin
- Hanyu Pinyin: Kuí Fāng
Yue: Cantonese
- Yale Romanization: Kwàih fōng
- Jyutping: Kwai4 fong1

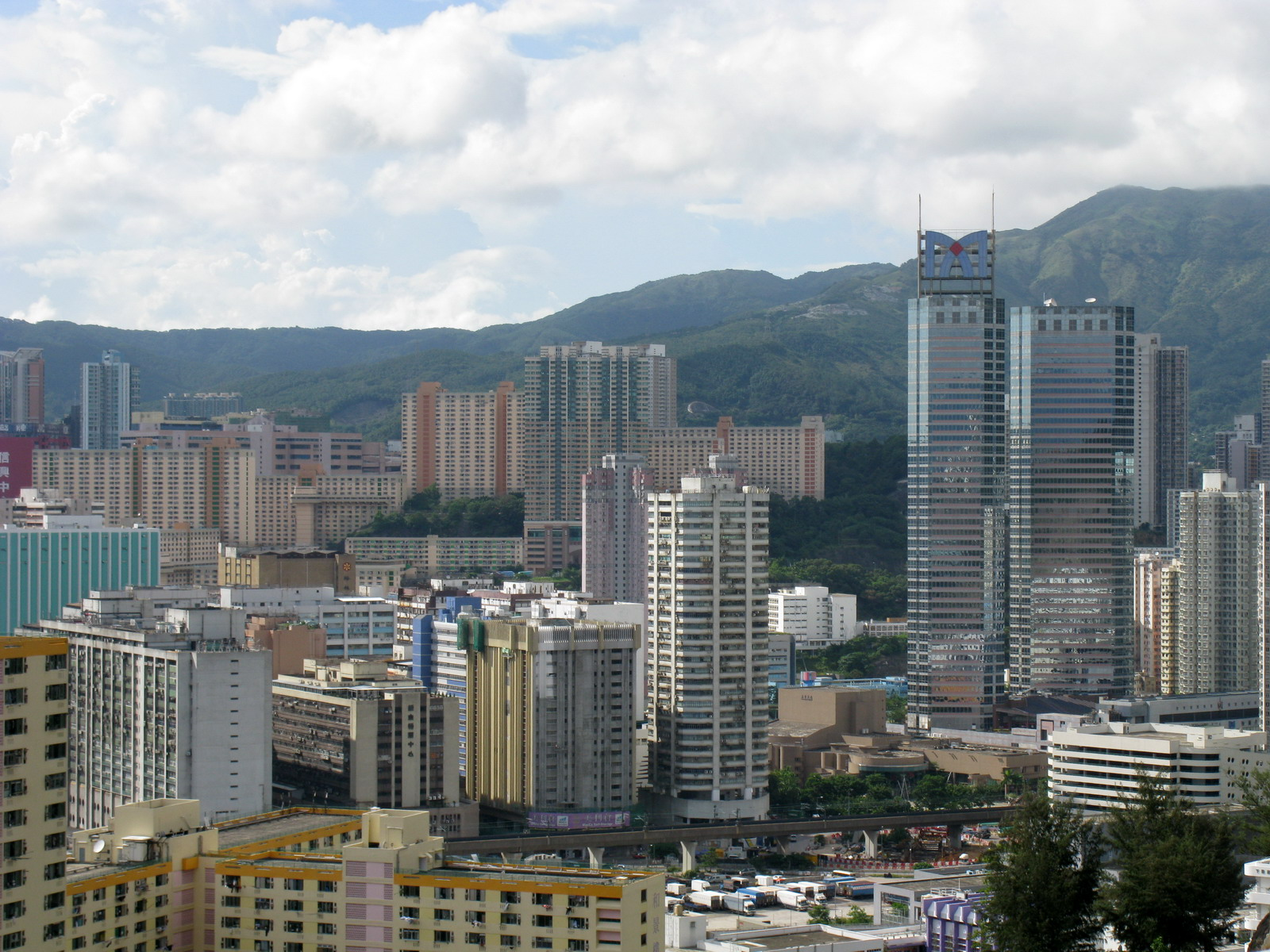
View of Kwai Fong, with the Metroplaza Towers on the right.

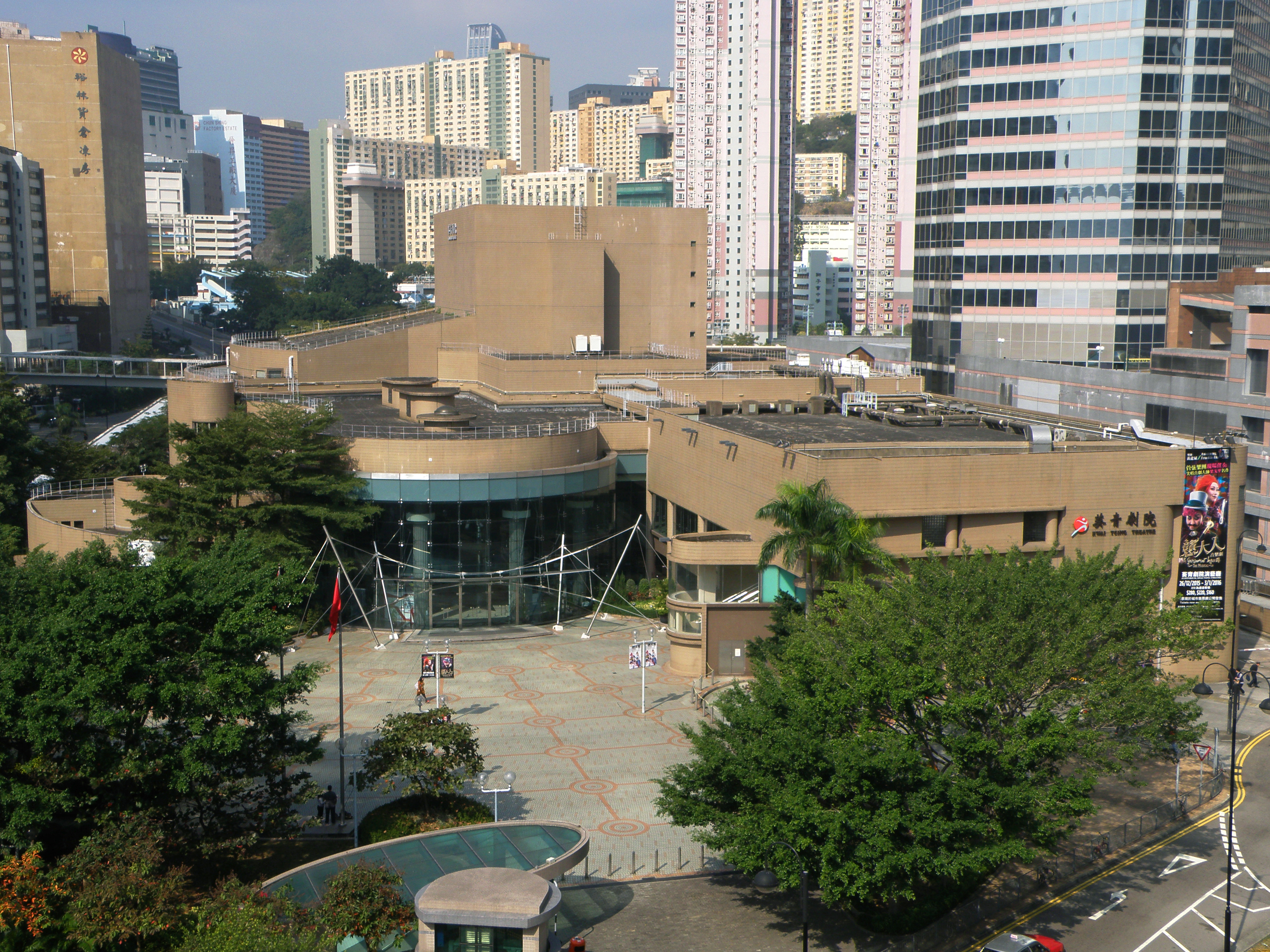
Kwai Tsing Theatre

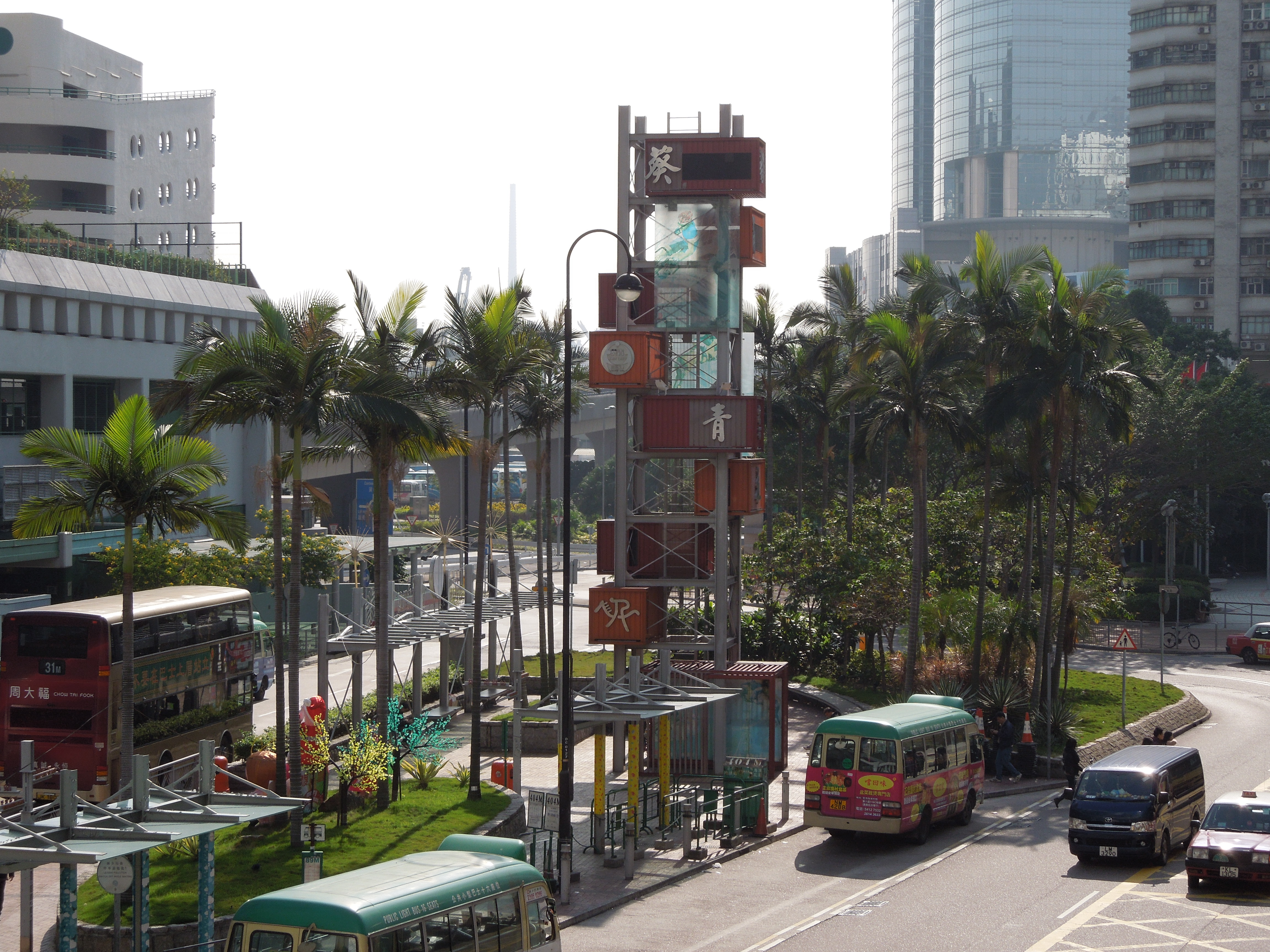
Container sculpture between Kwai Fong station and Metroplaza.

Kwai Fong is an area of Kwai Chung Town, Kwai Tsing District, Hong Kong.

== Location ==
The mainly residential area extends to Kwai Hing (葵興) in the north, Lai King in the south, Tsing Yi Bridge to the west, and Tai Lin Pai Industrial Area to the east. It is part of the reclamation of Gin Drinkers Bay in 1960s.

== Name ==
Kwai Fong is named after Kwai Fong Estate, a public housing estate. Kwai (葵) is the first Chinese character of Kwai Chung. Before the Mass Transit Railway (MTR) served the area, there were only few private residential blocks west of the estate.

== Features ==
=== Shopping ===
The area contains two mega-plazas, Metroplaza and Kwai Chung Plaza.

=== Schools ===
Two of the most well known schools in the area are Daughters of Mary Help of Christians Siu Ming Catholic Secondary School and Buddhist Sin Tak College.

Kwai Fong is in Primary One Admission (POA) School Net 65, which includes multiple aided schools (schools operated independently of the government but funded with government money); none of the schools in the net are government schools.

=== Recreation ===
Kwai Chung Sports Ground is a major sports ground in Kwai Tsing District. It has track and field facilities and a football pitch. It was the first facility in the district to include Tartan track. It is situated next to Hing Fong Road, opposite Metropolitan Plaza.

Kwai Tsing Theatre, a performance venue, is located near Kwai Fong MTR station and Metropolitan Plaza.

== Transportation ==
The area is well served by public transport to Kowloon, via Kwai Fong MTR station and buses.
