= Kwai Tsing Theatre =

Coordinates: 22°21′25″N 114°07′34″E

- 葵青劇院
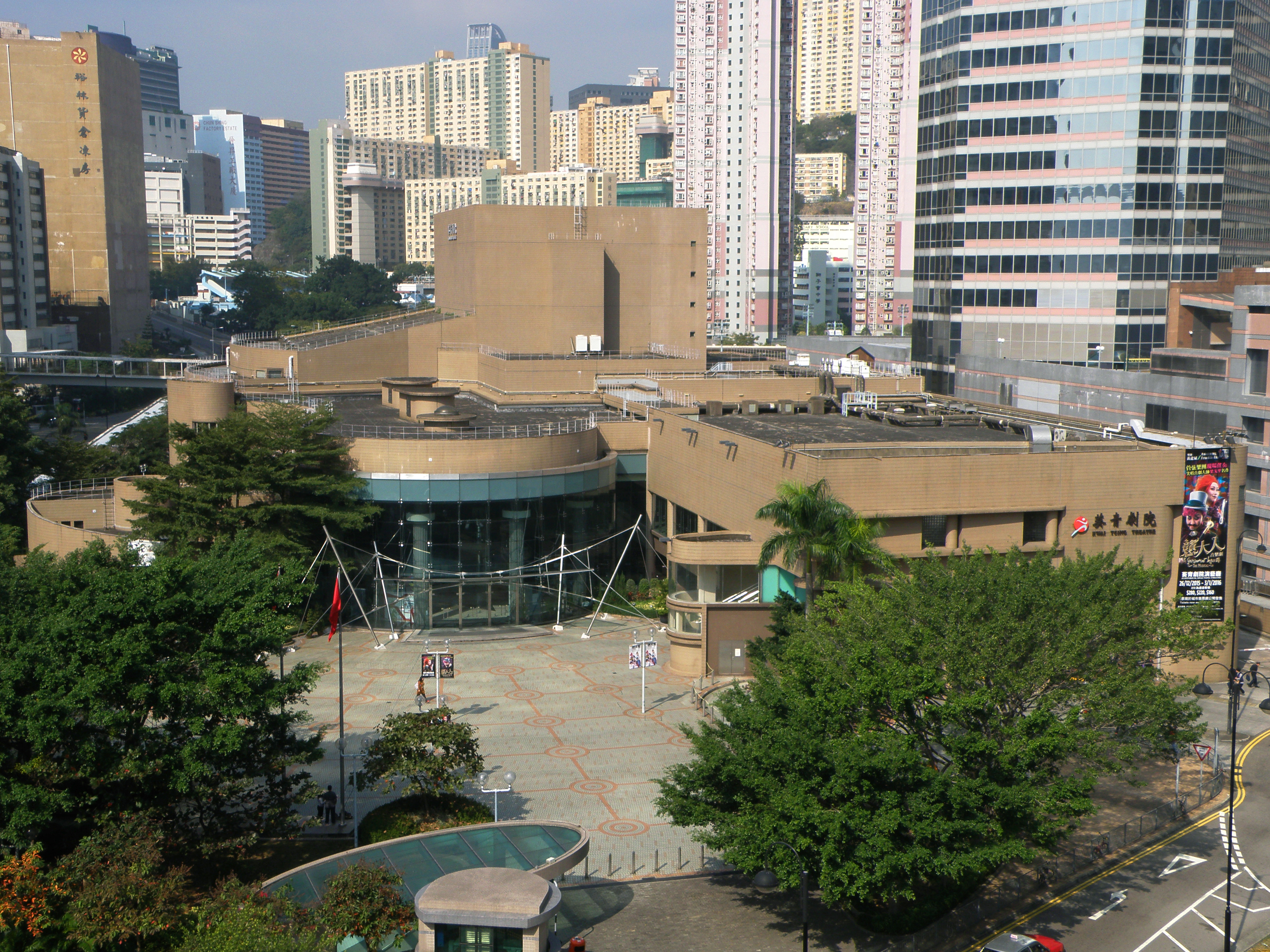
- Overview of the theatre and forecourt

- Location within Hong Kong

General information
- Status: Completed
- Type: Performing arts venue
- Location: No. 12 Hing Ning Road; Kwai Chung, New Territories; Hong Kong
- Opened: 18 November 1999; 26 years ago
- Cost: HK$468 million

Design and construction
- Architect: Architectural Services Department
- Structural engineer: Ove Arup & Partners
- Quantity surveyor: DG Jones & Partners (HK) Ltd
- Main contractor: China International Water & Electric Corporation

Website
- lcsd.gov.hk/ktt

Kwai Tsing Theatre
- Traditional Chinese: 葵青劇院
- Simplified Chinese: 葵青剧院
Transcriptions
Standard Mandarin
- Hanyu Pinyin: Kuíqīng Jùyuàn
Yue: Cantonese
- Jyutping: kwai4 cing1 kek6 jyun6*2

Kwai Tsing Theatre (Chinese: 葵青劇院) is a major performance venue in Kwai Chung, New Territories, Hong Kong. It is located in Kwai Fong, near Kwai Fong MTR station. It was built by the Regional Council and opened on 18 November 1999 to provide a medium-size venue for performances. It has an 899-seat auditorium, a black box theatre, and various smaller function rooms.

== History ==
A working group appointed by the Recreation and Culture Select Committee of the former Regional Council presented a report, on 13 May 1989, that observed "a dearth of purpose-built, well-located, medium-sized civic centres" in the council's service area. As a result, the council began studying building such a venue within Kwai Tsing District.

On 31 May 1990, the council approved, in principle, the provision of a new civic centre in Kwai Tsing District. In the planning stages it was called the Kwai Tsing Civic Centre.

Construction began in 1994. The theatre was planned and designed by the Architectural Services Department, a department of the Hong Kong Government. It was engineered by Ove Arup & Partners and built by China International Water & Electric Corporation.

The theatre was officially opened by Lau Wong-fat, chairman of the Provisional Regional Council, on 18 November 1999. It cost HK$468 million. Since 2000, the theatre has been managed by the Leisure and Cultural Services Department (LCSD).

In early 2008, the exhibition gallery was converted into the LCSD's first black box theatre. The renovation was completed in response to local arts groups concerned by the shortage of smaller performance venues in Hong Kong.

== Features ==
- Auditorium (899 seats)
- Black box theatre (130-160 seats)
- Dance studio
- Lecture room (98 removable seats)
- Outdoor plaza
- Rehearsal room
- Restaurant

== Notable events ==
On 2 September 2010, following the Manila hostage crisis, the Hong Thai Travel Services organised a public memorial service at the theatre for killed tour leader Masa Tse Ting Chunn (謝廷駿), who was posthumously awarded the Medal for Bravery (Gold) for gallantry during the standoff.

== Transport ==
The Kwai Tsing Theatre is located opposite Kwai Fong station of the Mass Transit Railway (MTR).

== See also ==
- Culture of Hong Kong
