= Lai King station =

MTR interchange station in the New Territories, Hong Kong

Lai King 茘景
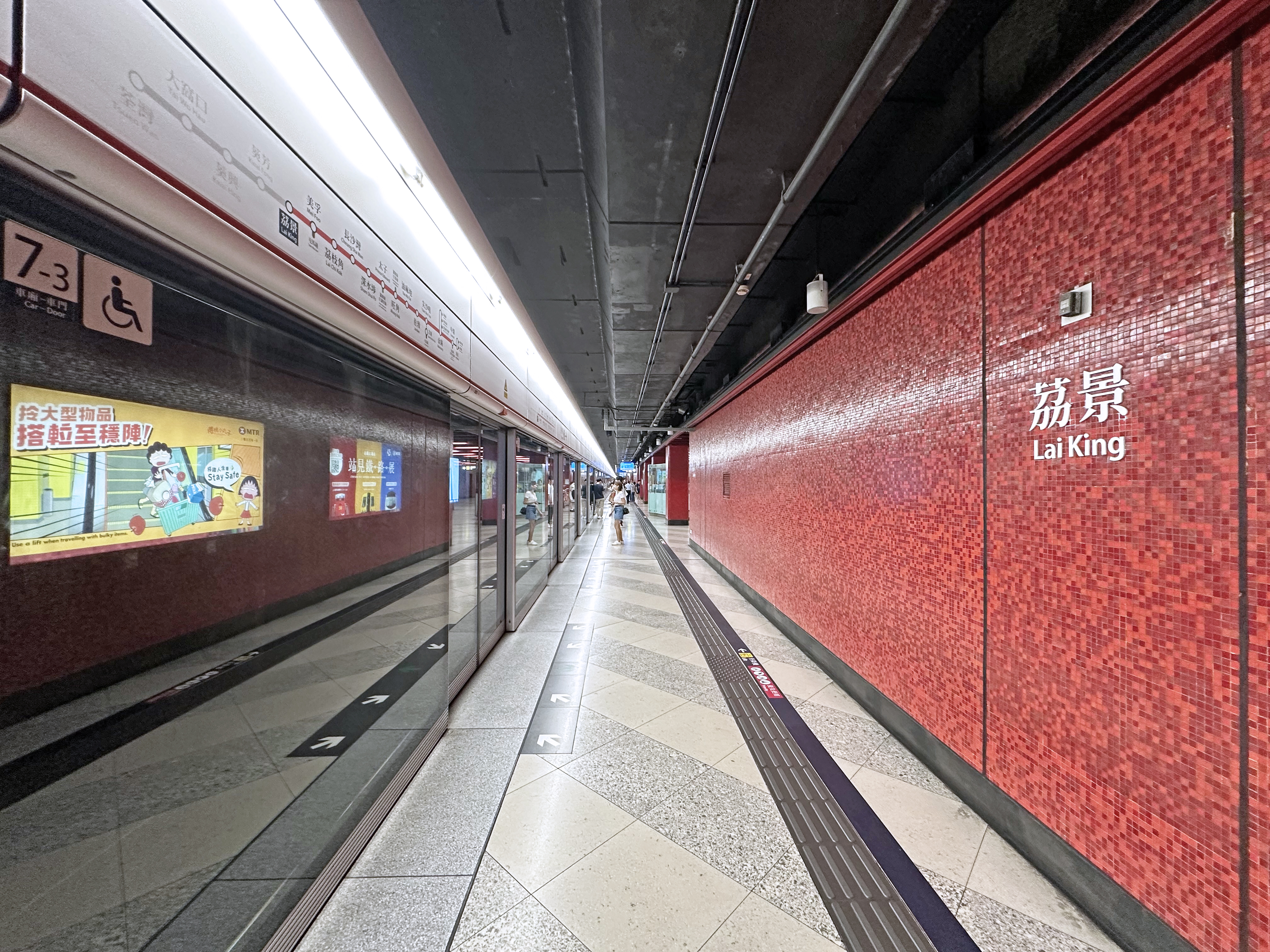
- Platform 2

Chinese name
- Chinese: 荔景
- Cantonese Yale: Laih gíng
- Literal meaning: Lychee View
Transcriptions
Standard Mandarin
- Hanyu Pinyin: Lìjǐng
Yue: Cantonese
- Yale Romanization: Laih gíng
- IPA: [lɐ̀i̯.kěŋ]
- Jyutping: Lai6 ging2

General information
- Location: Between Yin Lai Court and Yeung King House, Lai King Estate, Kwai Chung; Kwai Tsing District; Hong Kong
- Coordinates: 22°20′54″N 114°07′34″E
- System: MTR rapid transit station
- Owner: MTR Corporation
- Operator: MTR Corporation
- Lines: Tsuen Wan line; Tung Chung line
- Platforms: 4 (2 island platforms)
- Tracks: 6
- Connections: Bus, minibus

Construction
- Structure type: Upper platforms: Elevated; Lower platforms: At-grade/underground
- Platform levels: 2
- Accessible: Yes

Other information
- Station code: LAK

History
- Opened: Tsuen Wan line : 17 May 1982; 44 years ago; Tung Chung line : 22 June 1998; 28 years ago
- Electrified: 1,500 V DC (Overhead line)

Services
Preceding station	MTR	Following station
Mei Foo towards Central	Tsuen Wan line	Kwai Fong towards Tsuen Wan
Nam Cheong towards Hong Kong	Tung Chung line	Tsing Yi towards Tung Chung
Airport Express does not stop here
Track layout
Location
- Location within MTR

Lai King is a metro station in Hong Kong, operated as part of the MTR rapid transit network. The station is located above ground on a viaduct and is an interchange for the Tsuen Wan and Tung Chung lines.

The Chinese name of the station uses the classical character of 茘 instead of the contemporary version of 荔. The former is regarded as orthodox per the Kangxi dictionary. The same goes for Lai Chi Kok station which shares the same character.

== History ==
=== Tsuen Wan Line ===
Lai King was opened on 10 May 1982 as an intermediate stop on the Tsuen Wan line. The station was built to serve the adjacent public housing complex and the container terminal on the coast. The station contractor was Maeda-Okumura joint venture.

=== Tung Chung Line ===
When the rail link to Lantau Island was announced, Lai King was chosen to be the interchange between the Tsuen Wan line and the then proposed Tung Chung line. The new line's construction of a station and tunnels was awarded to Maeda Corporation under Contract 508 in December 1994. During the construction of the Tung Chung line platforms, the layout of the station was significantly altered. New tracks were added above the existing tracks to provide a cross-platform interchange between the Tung Chung and Tsuen Wan lines. The outbound Tsuen Wan line trains now stops on the same level as the outbound Tung Chung line trains, and the same goes for the inbound services.

An additional pair of tracks was constructed to permit the Airport Express trains to bypass Lai King without stopping. The station is made up of six tracks with four platforms.

A public washroom was made available since 31 October 2019.

== Station layout ==
This station is a cross-platform interchange.

Outbound (Tung Chung-bound) passengers on the Tung Chung line can walk across the platform at Lai King to board the Tsuen Wan line trains for destinations in Kwai Chung and Tsuen Wan.

Those who are travelling to Central and Hong Kong Island from Kwai Chung and Tsuen Wan can transfer at Lai King, across the platform, for an express service on the Tung Chung line. Given both the Tsuen Wan line and Tung Chung line trains terminate at the Central & Hong Kong station complex, most passengers opt for the latter (suggest for the Tung Chung Line) as it makes fewer stops. As a result, the station is often crowded at peak hours given the number of transfer passengers.

GExit A	Ground	Exit A1 (Lai King Hill Road)
L1Exit B	Passageway	Exits A2, A3, C (Yin Lai Court, Lai King Estate)
L3Upper Platform	Platform 1	← Tsuen Wan line towards Tsuen Wan (Kwai Fong)
L3Upper Platform	Island platform, doors will open on the left for Tsuen Wan line and right for Tung Chung line
L3Upper Platform	Platform 3	← Tung Chung line towards Tung Chung (Tsing Yi)
L4Exit C	Upper concourse	Exits, MTR Shops, automatic teller machines
L4Exit C	Lower concourse	Exits, customer service
L4Exit C	Lower concourse	MTR Shops, Hang Seng Bank, automatic teller machines
L5Lower Platform	Platform 2	Tsuen Wan line towards Central (Mei Foo) →
L5Lower Platform	Island platform, doors will open on the right for Tsuen Wan line and left for Tung Chung line
L5Lower Platform	Platform 4	Tung Chung line towards Hong Kong (Nam Cheong) →
L5Lower Platform	Airport Express	Airport Express does not stop here →
L5Lower Platform	Airport Express	← Airport Express does not stop here

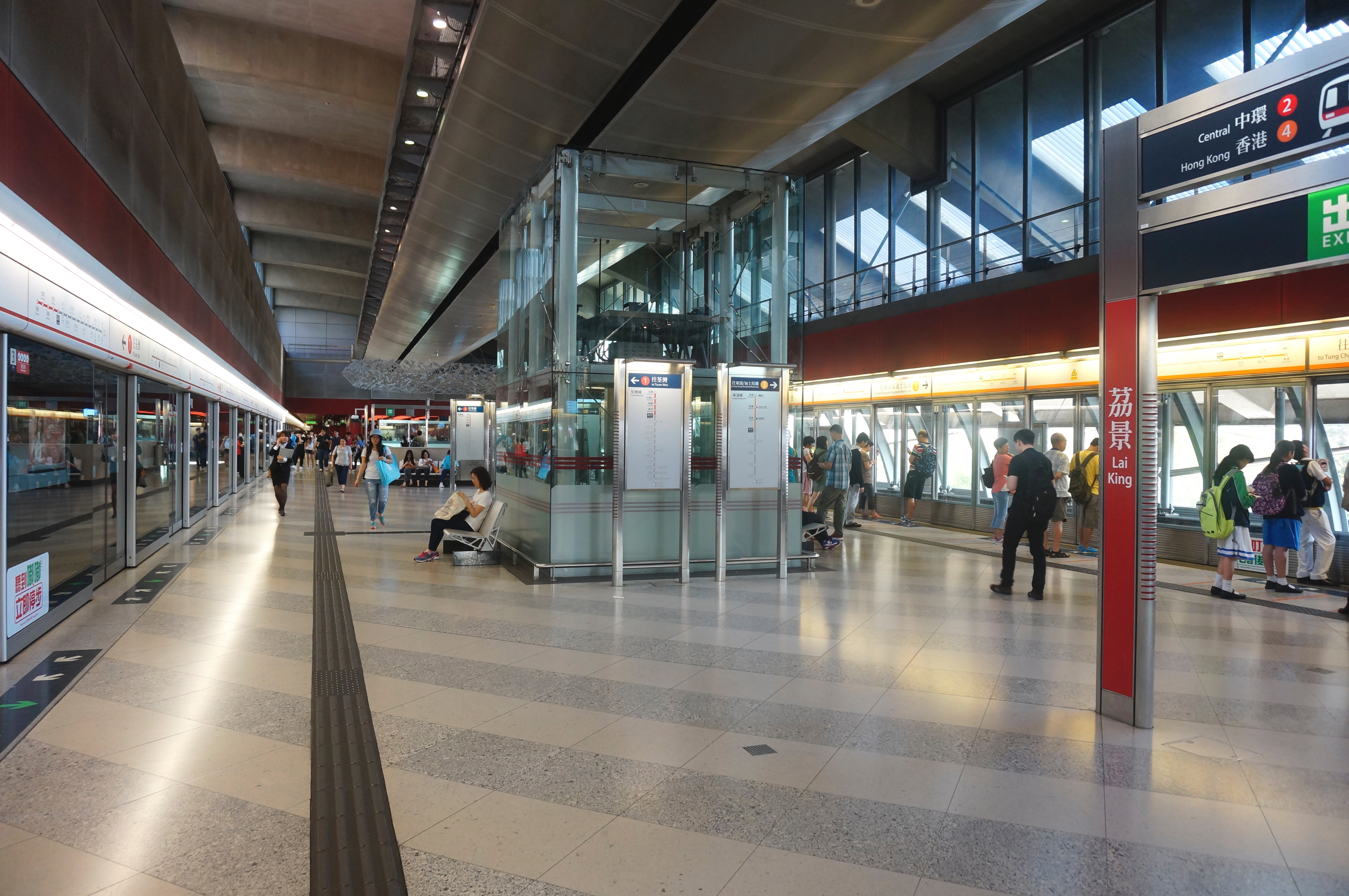
L3 platforms

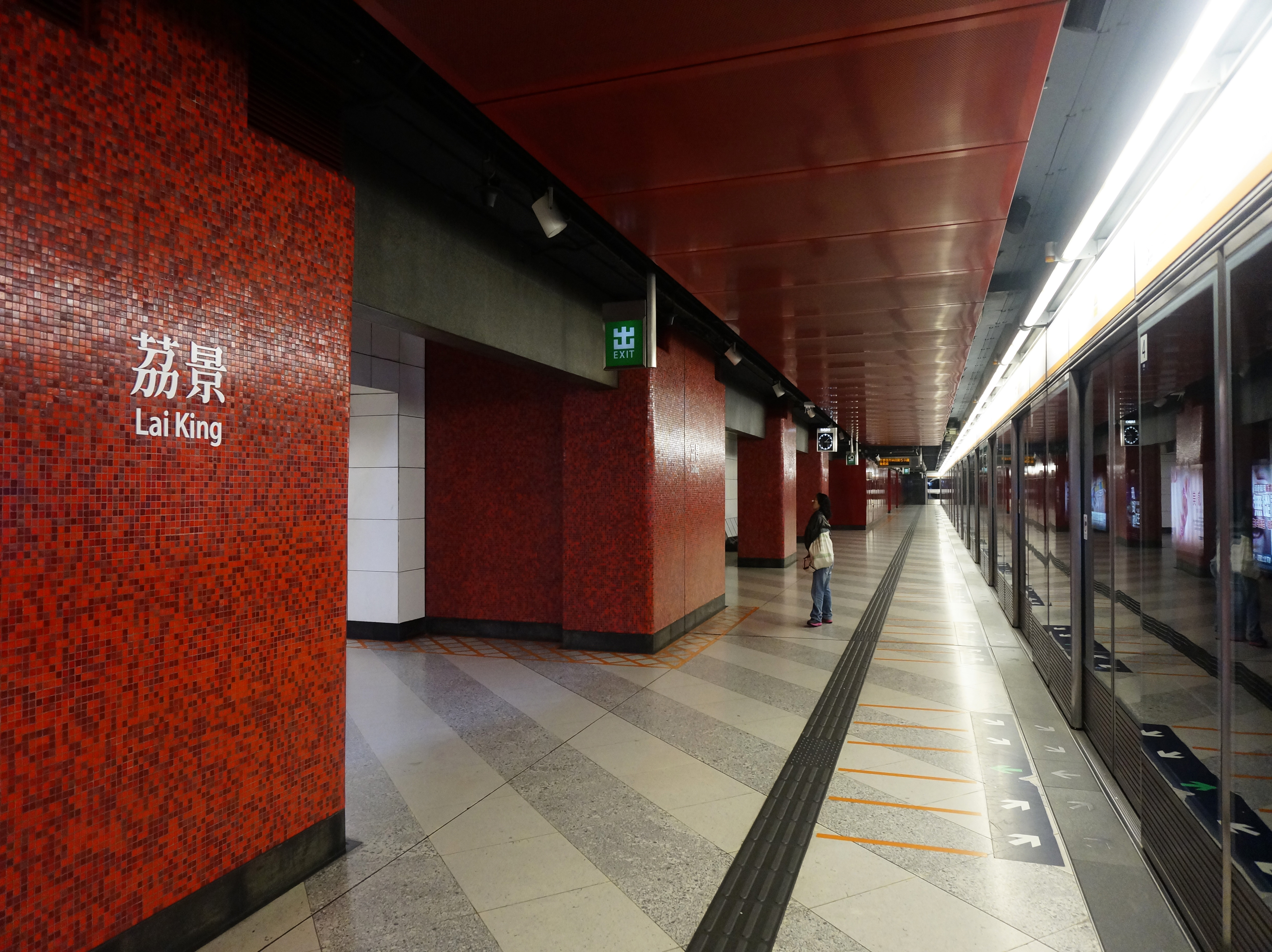
Tung Chung line Platform 4

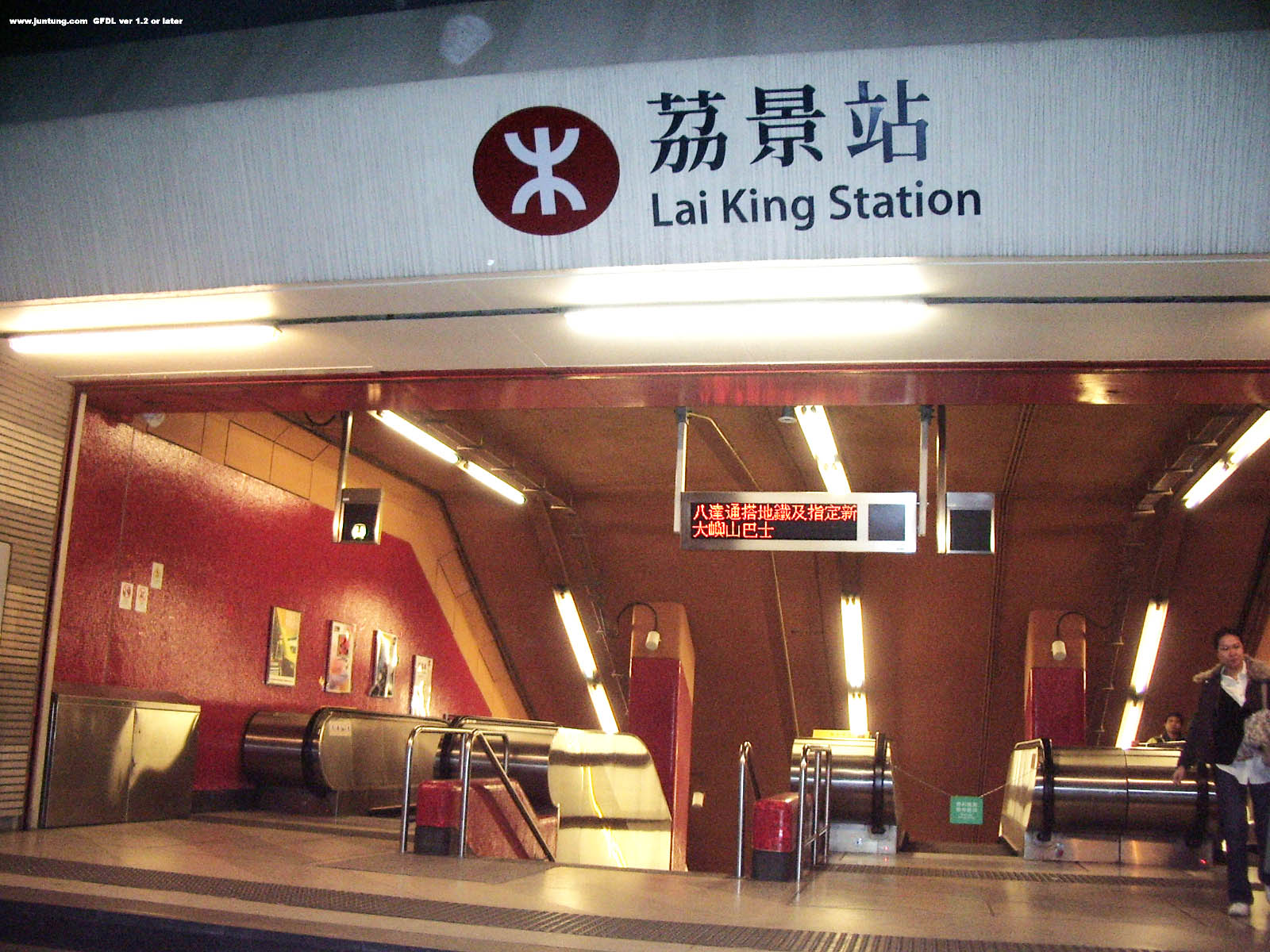
Exit A1

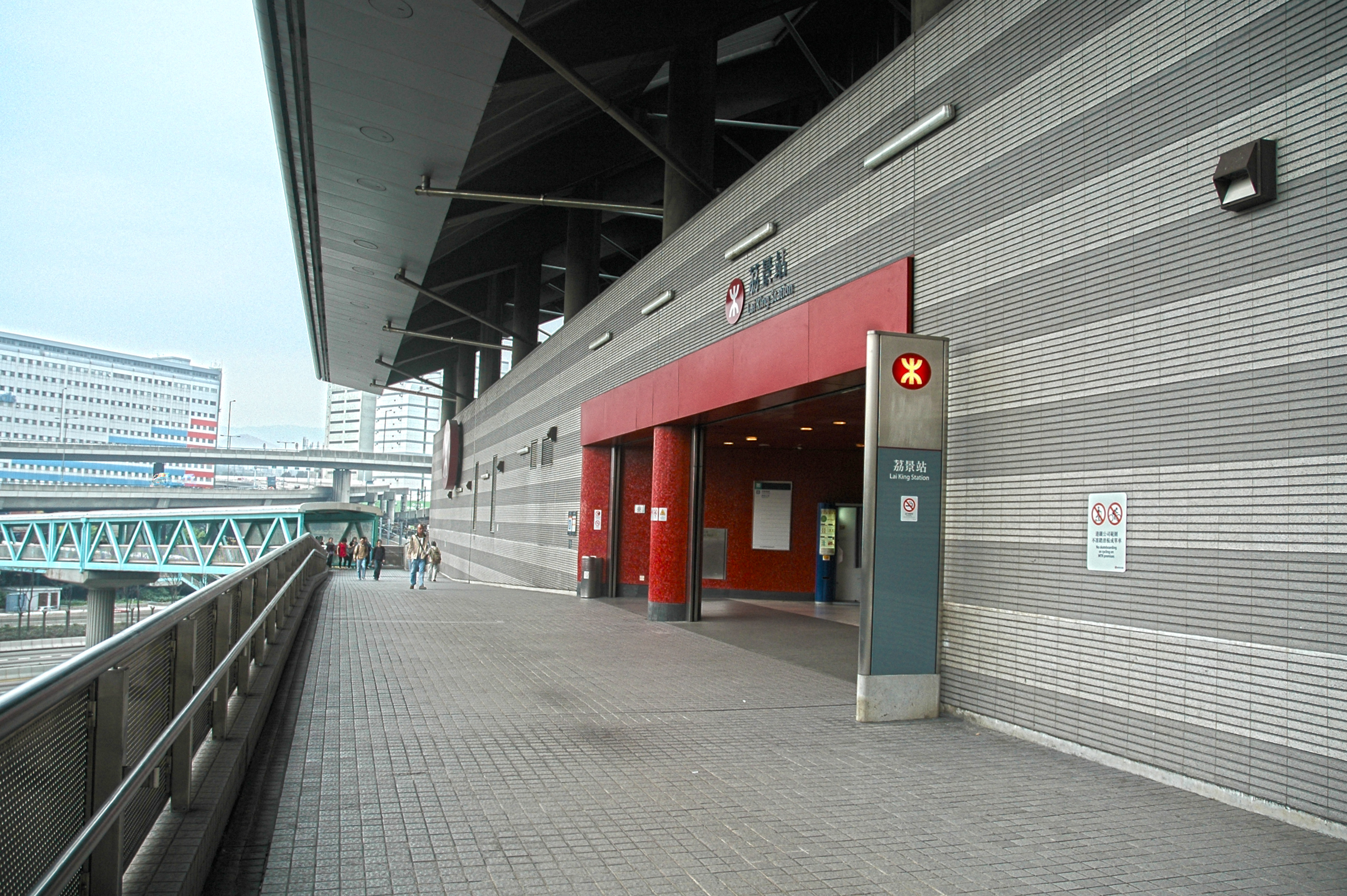
Exit B

== Entrances/exits ==
- A1: Lai King Hill Road
- A2: Yin Lai Court
- A3: Lai King Estate
- B: Kwai Chung Container Terminal
- C: HKEAA Lai King Assessment Centre
