= Tsuen Wan line =

Hong Kong MTR railway line

Tsuen Wan Line

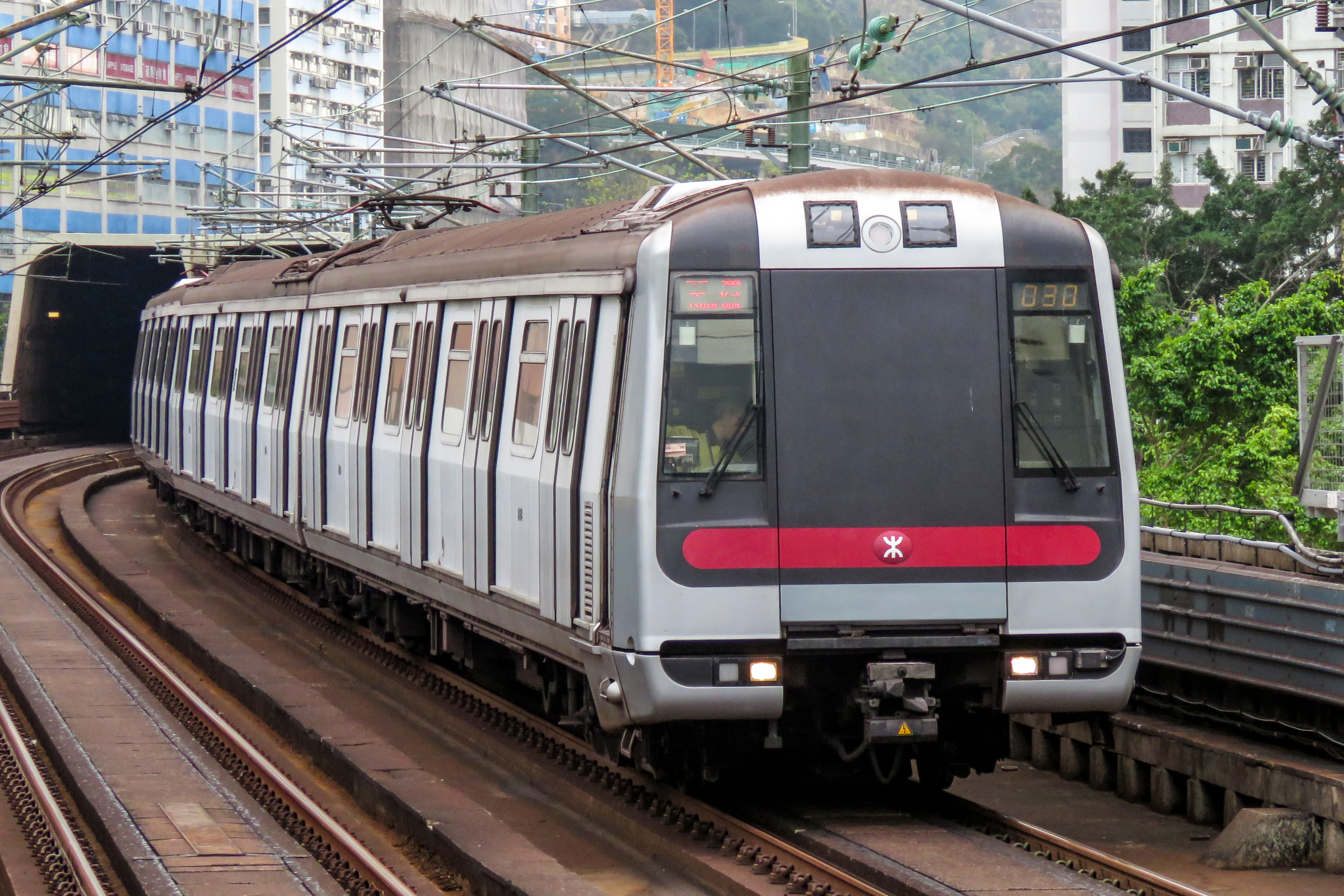
- An M-Train approaching Kwai Hing station

Overview
- Native name: 荃灣綫
- Status: Operational
- Owner: MTR Corporation
- Locale: Districts: Tsuen Wan, Kwai Tsing, Sham Shui Po, Yau Tsim Mong, Central & Western
- Termini: Tsuen Wan; Central
- Connecting lines: East Rail line Via Admiralty; Island line Via Admiralty, Central; South Island line Via Admiralty; Kwun Tong line Via Prince Edward, Mong Kok, Yau Ma Tei; Tuen Ma line Via Mei Foo, Tsim Sha Tsui-East Tsim Sha Tsui; Tung Chung line Via Lai King, Hong Kong-Central; Airport Express Via Hong Kong-Central
- Former connections: West Rail line
- Stations: 16
- Color on map: Red (#ED1D24)

Service
- Type: Rapid transit
- System: MTR
- Operator: MTR Corporation
- Depot: Tsuen Wan Depot
- Rolling stock: Metro Cammell EMU (DC) Until December 2026 CRRC Qingdao Sifang EMU
- Ridership: 1,058,300 daily average (weekdays, September 2014)

History
- Work began: November 1978; 48 years ago
- Opened: 10 May 1982; 44 years ago

Technical
- Line length: 16,000 m (9.9 mi)
- Track length: 16.9 km (10.5 mi)
- Num of tracks: Double-track
- Track gauge: 1,432 mm (4 ft 8 3/8 in)
- Electrification: 1,500 V DC (overhead line)
- Operating speed: 33 km/h (21 mph) (average); 80 km/h (50 mph) (maximum)
- Signalling: SelTrac CBTC (from 15 March 2026; 8 months ago onwards)
- Train protection system: SelTrac CBTC
Route map

Tsuen Wan line
- Traditional Chinese: 荃灣綫
- Simplified Chinese: 荃湾线
Transcriptions
Standard Mandarin
- Hanyu Pinyin: Quánwān xiàn
Yue: Cantonese
- Yale Romanization: chyùhn wāan sin
- Jyutping: cyun4 waan1 sin3
- IPA: [tɕʰy̏ːn wáːn ɕīːn]

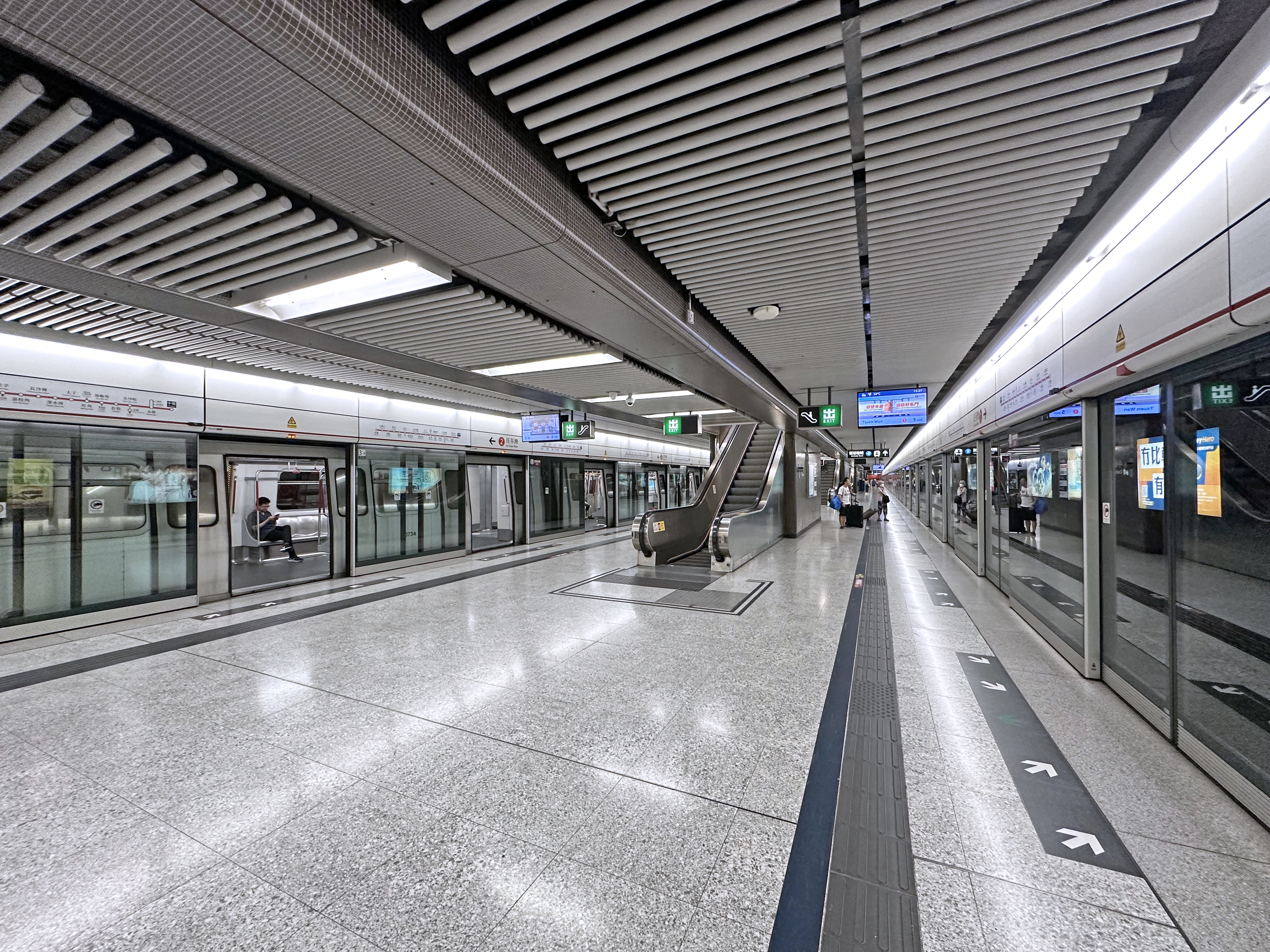
Platform screen doors installed at Central station on the Tsuen Wan line

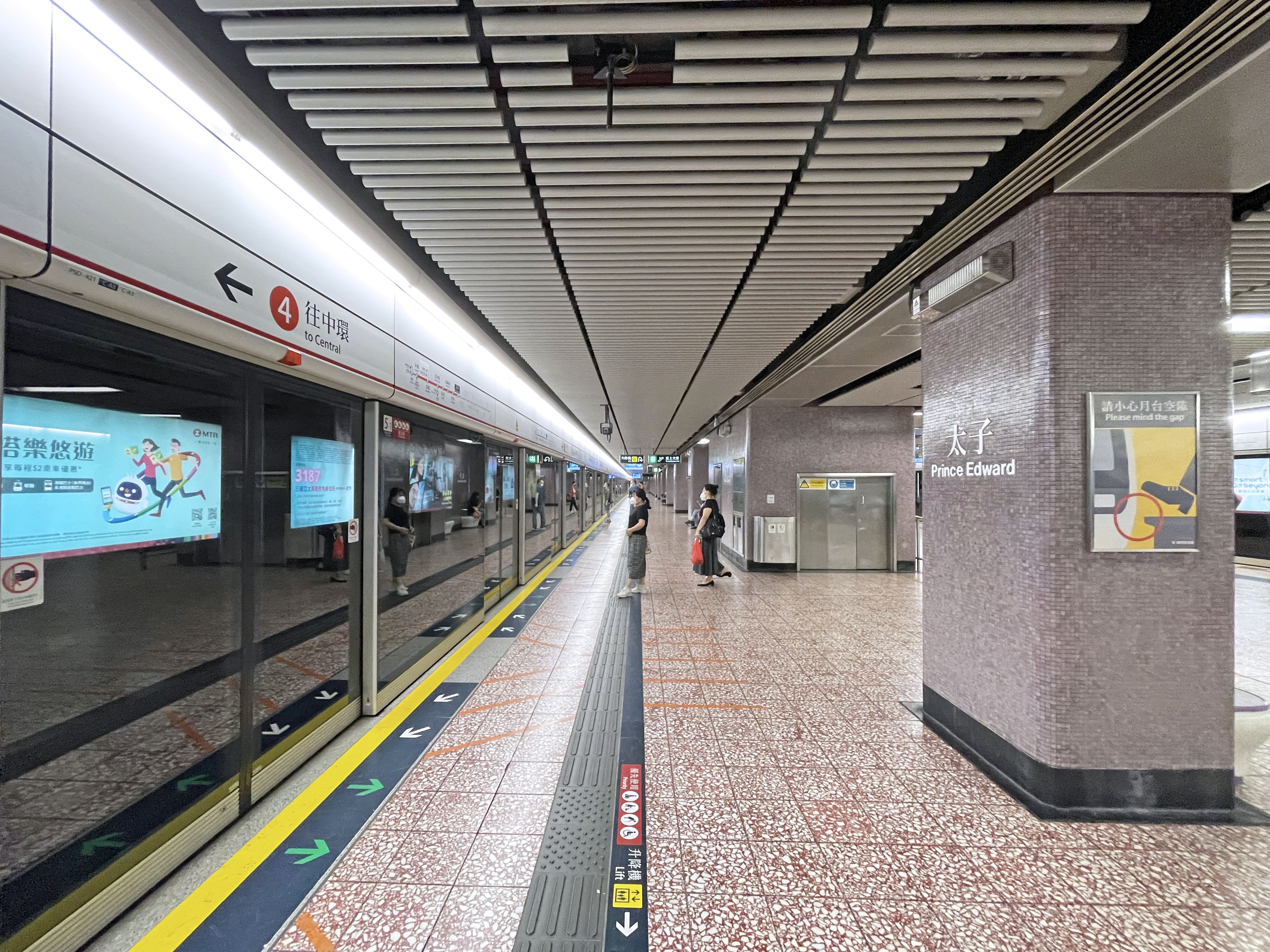
Prince Edward station in Kowloon

The Tsuen Wan line (Chinese: 荃灣綫) is one of the ten lines of the metro network in Hong Kong's MTR.

There are 16 stations on the line. The southern terminus is Central station on Hong Kong Island and the northwestern terminus is Tsuen Wan station in the New Territories. A journey on the entire line takes approximately 35 minutes.

As a cross-harbour route that goes through the heart of Kowloon and densely populated Sham Shui Po and Kwai Chung, the line is very heavily travelled.

== History ==
=== Construction ===
The Tsuen Wan line was the second of the three original lines of the MTR network. The initial plan for this line was somewhat different from the current line, especially in the names and the construction characteristics of the New Territories section.

The original plan envisioned a terminus in a valley further west of the present Tsuen Wan station. That Tsuen Wan West station is different from the current Tsuen Wan West station on the Tuen Ma line, which is located under land reclaimed at a much later time. The line was supposed to run underground in Tsuen Wan rather than on the ground level, as is currently the case.

The approved route was truncated, terminating at Tsuen Wan station. The construction of the Tsuen Wan Extension project was approved in 1975 and commenced soon afterwards. Testing of the new line began on 1 March 1982.

The extension was formally opened on 10 May 1982 by Sir Philip Haddon-Cave, the acting governor and former chairman of the Mass Transit Railway Provisional Authority. The project was opened seven and a half months ahead of schedule, and cost HK$3.9 billion, under budget compared to the original estimate of HK$4.1 billion.

The new section from Tsuen Wan to Lai King and skipping all intermediate stations to Prince Edward opened on 17 May 1982 and joined the section under Nathan Road in Kowloon that had been in service since 1979 as part of the Kwun Tong line. On opening, Prince Edward was an interchange-only station with no option to enter or exit. It did not become a standard station until the remaining stations on the line in Sham Shui Po District, i.e. Sham Shui Po, Cheung Sha Wan, Lai Chi Kok and Mei Foo, opened a week later.

Several stations differ in names or location from the initial plan. During planning, Kwai Hing was named Kwai Chung, Kwai Fong was Lap Sap Wan (literally "rubbish bay", as the location was close to a now-disused landfill in Gin Drinker's Bay), Lai Wan (now Mei Foo) was Lai Chi Kok, Lai Chi Kok was Cheung Sha Wan, Cheung Sha Wan was So Uk. These stations were all renamed in English and Chinese before service began.

Upon the opening of the Island line, Chater, Waterloo, and Argyle, originally named based on the streets crossing or above the stations, Chater Road, Argyle Street, and Waterloo Road respectively, were renamed to Central, Yau Ma Tei, and Mong Kok, resembling the names of the station in Chinese. Lai Wan was renamed to Mei Foo in both English and Chinese.

Mong Kok station was planned to be built a bit further north of its present location and Sham Shui Po a bit further south of its present location before the need to accommodate an intermediate station, Prince Edward.

=== Transfer with Tung Chung line ===
When the Tung Chung line was constructed, Lai King was selected as an interchange so that passengers did not have to go all the way to Hong Kong Island to change trains. The northbound tracks on the Tsuen Wan line were moved to run above the southbound tracks at Lai King to support cross-platform interchange with the Tung Chung line.

The original platform 1 for Tsuen Wan-bound trains was removed and filled, becoming part of the current, wider low-level island platform. This allowed interchange with platform 4 for Hong Kong-bound Tung Chung line trains, which run on tracks further away from the original platform.

The new platform was opened in 1997, nearly a year before the Tung Chung line began service. Tracks were also built to the south of Lai King station linking the Tsuen Wan line and Tung Chung line; this is the only point where the Tung Chung line's tracks connects with the other urban lines.

=== Transfer with former KCR systems ===
To cope with extensions and new lines, Mei Foo and Tsim Sha Tsui stations had new subsurface walkways added to connect to KCR West Rail's Mei Foo and East Tsim Sha Tsui stations. The interchange facilities at Mei Foo opened in 2003 when the West Rail was opened. The interchange located at Tsim Sha Tsui entered service in 2004, along with the completion of the East Rail line's (formerly KCR East Rail) extension to East Tsim Sha Tsui.

=== Chronology ===
- 1967: Tsuen Wan line was included in Hong Kong Mass Transport Study
- 1970: Tsuen Wan line was included in Hong Kong Mass Transit Further Studies, as Kong Kow line and Tsuen Wan Branch
- 1977: Construction was approved and, not long after, started on 1 March 1979
- 16 Dec 1979: Jordan and Tsim Sha Tsui opened as part of Kwun Tong line
- 22 Dec 1979: Waterloo and Argyle opened as part of Kwun Tong line
- 12 Feb 1980: Admiralty and Chater opened as part of Kwun Tong line
- 26 Apr 1982: The original Kwun Tong line was split into two sections: the new Kwun Tong line ran as far as Waterloo, while the Tsuen Wan line ran from Chater to Argyle; there were non-passenger Tsuen Wan line trains that continued to Tsuen Wan
- 17 May 1982: Begin operation
- 31 May 1985: On the opening of the Island line, 8 stations of the line were renamed. (See station list below for details)
- 23 May 1986: Central became an interchange station upon the extension of the Island line to Sheung Wan
- 11 Mar 1991: The line broke down and public transport was adversely affected
- 23 Apr 1993: Two interlinking carriages disconnected during operation within the section between Tsuen Wan and Tai Wo Hau. Nobody was hurt, and MTRC reported that a hook between the two concerned carriages was not fastened, leading to the incident
- Jun 1996: the current system (supposedly) that the line uses has fully replaced the old system
- 2 Jul 1997: The new platform 1 situated on the new high-level platform at Lai King opened
- 20 Mar 2003: To connect with the new KCR West Rail Mei Foo station, a passageway was built between the two stations, with a new exit D near about midway of the passageway to the West Rail platforms. It's a 8-minute walk.
- 5 Jan 2004: A fire started in a train on its way to Admiralty station with 14 people injured. A 55-year-old male arsonist was responsible for the fire and was arrested the following day.
- 24 Oct 2004: A new exit G at Tsim Sha Tsui was constructed for a passageway under Mody Road to connect the station with new KCR East Rail
- 30 Mar 2005: A new exit F at Tsim Sha Tsui was constructed for a passageway under Middle Road to connect to East Tsim Sha Tsui station
- 21 Oct 2010: An overhead electric cable near Yau Ma Tei station had a problem during service hours; at least 280,000 passengers were affected, with noises above the train ceiling heard by the driver when the problem emerged, and the driver drove the train into Yau Ma Tei station and unloaded the passengers. Service resumed on the line three hours later.
- 10 Feb 2017: In the first car of Metro Cammell EMU (DC) A113/A192, a 60-year-old man (surname Cheung) was talking to himself, and suddenly yelled "You killed my son!", and swear words. He later got a flammable bottle, splashed it on himself and some other passengers. Some passengers tried to stop him, but resulted in vain as he used a lighter and lit himself up. Some other passengers clothes caught on fire, and in return gave them burns. Emergency ventilation windows were opened, people escaped to other cars, and some yelled, creating a mad sight. The fire was extinguished at Tsim Sha Tsui station, but still caused all trains to not stop at Tsim Sha Tsui station for the day, with a temporary bus service connecting Tsim Sha Tsui station and Yau Ma Tei station. A total of 19 people were injured, including the perpetrator. The perpetrator had mental problems and died three months later in Prince of Wales Hospital.
- 7 Mar 2018: a driver fainted in the cockpit of a train, and was sent to hospital. The train was driven back to depot and all affected passengers were arranged to board a train 2 mins later.
- 16 Mar 2019: a totally naked foreign man entered the tracks in Lai King station at 8 p.m. and left the tracks near Kwai Hing station. Police later arrested him and are investigating the reason why. Train service resumed at 8:35 p.m. after the delay due to the incident.

== Rolling stock ==
MTR Tsuen Wan Line rolling stock
Model	Manufactured	Time of manufacturing	Sets	Assembly	Notes
M-Train	Metro-Cammell	1977-1986; 1989-1995	9	A-C+D+B-C+D+C-A	To be replaced by the new Q-Trains
Q-Train	CRRC Qingdao Sifang	2017–present	26	A-C-B+B-C+B-C-A	To Replace all the M-Trains
MTR Tsuen Wan Line former rolling stock
Model	Manufactured	Time in manufacturing	Sets	Assembly	Notes
K-Train	Hyundai Rotem and Mitsubishi Heavy Industries	2001-2002	N/A	A-C-B+B-C+B-C-A	Now used on Tseung Kwan O line
C-Train	CNR Changchun	2011	1 (A361/A362)	A-C-B+B-C+B-C-A	Now used on Kwun Tong line

== Route description ==
The Tsuen Wan line runs north–south. It is mostly underground, beginning at Central and crossing Victoria Harbour after Admiralty to Tsim Sha Tsui. Then, the line first runs underneath Nathan Road (Tsim Sha Tsui to Prince Edward), then Cheung Sha Wan Road (Sham Shui Po to Mei Foo), before emerging from the hills at Lai King.

The line is elevated between Lai King and Kwai Hing. Between Kwai Fong and Kwai Hing, the tracks are covered to minimise disturbance to residents nearby. After Kwai Hing, the line re-enters the tunnel to Tai Wo Hau before ending at Tsuen Wan.

Some of the underground stations on the line are significantly deeper than the others. Tsim Sha Tsui and Admiralty stations are deeper because they precede harbour crossings. Admiralty and Central are deeper as they provide cross-platform interchange with the deep-level Island line.

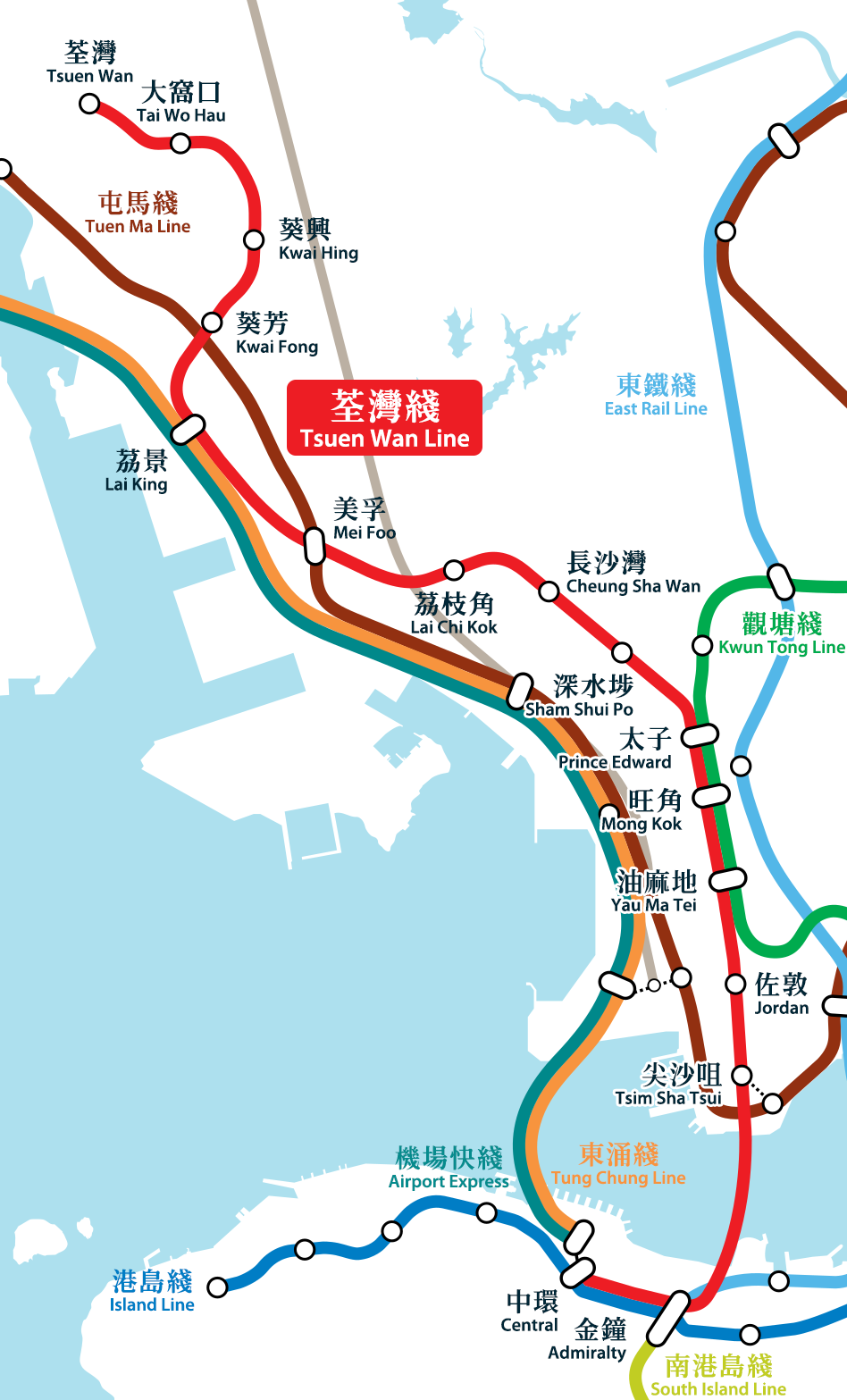
Geographically accurate map of the Tsuen Wan line

== List of stations ==
This is a list of the stations on the Tsuen Wan line.

List

Livery	Station		Images	Interchange; Adjacent transportation	Opened	District
Livery	English	Chinese	Images	Interchange; Adjacent transportation	Opened	District
Tsuen Wan Line (TWL)
	Central (formerly Chater)	中環		Island line towards Kennedy Town Hong Kong: Tung Chung line Airport Express	12 February 1980; 46 years ago (Note: Originally opened as part of the Kwun Tong line.)	Central and Western
	Admiralty	金鐘		Island line towards Chai Wan; South Island line; East Rail line	12 February 1980; 46 years ago	Central and Western
	Tsim Sha Tsui	尖沙咀		East Tsim Sha Tsui: Tuen Ma line	31 December 1979; 46 years ago	Yau Tsim Mong
	Jordan	佐敦		—	31 December 1979; 46 years ago	Yau Tsim Mong
	Yau Ma Tei (formerly Waterloo)	油麻地		Kwun Tong line towards Whampoa (Tsuen Wan direction)	31 December 1979; 46 years ago	Yau Tsim Mong
	Mong Kok (formerly Argyle)	旺角		Kwun Tong line towards Whampoa (Central direction) and towards Tiu Keng Leng (Tsuen Wan direction)	31 December 1979; 46 years ago	Yau Tsim Mong
	Prince Edward	太子		Kwun Tong line towards Tiu Keng Leng (Central direction)	10 May 1982; 44 years ago	Yau Tsim Mong
	Sham Shui Po	深水埗		—	17 May 1982; 44 years ago	Sham Shui Po
	Cheung Sha Wan	長沙灣		—	17 May 1982; 44 years ago	Sham Shui Po
	Lai Chi Kok	荔枝角		—	17 May 1982; 44 years ago	Sham Shui Po
	Mei Foo (formerly Lai Wan)	美孚		Tuen Ma line	17 May 1982; 44 years ago	Sham Shui Po
	Lai King	荔景		Tung Chung line	17 May 1982; 44 years ago	Kwai Tsing
	Kwai Fong	葵芳		—	17 May 1982; 44 years ago	Kwai Tsing
	Kwai Hing	葵興		—	17 May 1982; 44 years ago	Kwai Tsing
	Tai Wo Hau	大窩口		—	17 May 1982; 44 years ago	Tsuen Wan
	Tsuen Wan	荃灣		(Note: Tsuen Wan station is not an interchange station to Tsuen Wan West station on the Tuen Ma line, but green public light bus route 95K (free transfer with an immediate Tuen Ma Line journey record on the Octopus card) connects the two stations. It normally takes 15–20 minutes to walk to Tsuen Wan West station.)	17 May 1982; 44 years ago	Tsuen Wan

== Incidents ==
On 18 March 2019, two trains crashed in the crossover track section between Admiralty and Central while MTR was testing a new version of the SelTrac train control system provided by Toronto-based Canadian unit of Thales Group. There were no passengers aboard either train, although the operators of both trains were injured. Before the crash site had been cleaned up, all Tsuen Wan line trains terminated at Admiralty and returned to Tsuen Wan Depot instead of Central. Both MTR and Thales will be conducting their separate investigations. The same vendor also provided a similar signalling system in Singapore, which resulted in the 2017 Joo Koon train collision. In July 2019, the Electrical and Mechanical Services Department (EMSD) published an investigation report into the incident and concluded that a programming error in the signalling system led the ATP system to malfunction, resulting in the collision.

== See also ==
- List of places in Hong Kong
- Transport in Hong Kong
- Footbridge Network in Tsuen Wan
