= Kwai Luen (constituency) =

Hong Kong constituency

- 葵聯
- Elected constituency for the Kwai Tsing District Council
- Boundary of Kwai Luen in Kwai Tsing District
- District: Kwai Tsing
- Legislative Council constituency: New Territories South West
- Population: 13,492 (2019)
- Electorate: 7,699 (2019)

Current constituency
- Created: 2019
- Number of members: One
- Member: vacant
- Created from: Hing Fong, Kwai Hing

Kwai Luen (Chinese: 葵聯) is one of the 31 constituencies in the Kwai Tsing District.

Created in 2018 for the 2019 District Council elections, the constituency returns one district councillor to the Kwai Tsing District Council, with an election every four years.

Kwai Luen loosely covers area surrounding Kwai Luen Estate in Kwai Chung. It has projected population of 13,492.

== Councillors represented ==
Election	Member	Party
2019	Ng Kim-sing→vacant	Democratic

Ng was the member of Kwai Tsing District Council representing Hing Fong Constituency, which is in proximity to this constituency, from 1999 to 2019.

== Election results ==
=== 2010s ===
Kwai Tsing District Council Election, 2019: Kwai Luen
Party	Candidate	Votes	%	±%
Democratic	Ng Kim-sing	3,102	57.11	
Independent	Lok Siu-luen	2,296	42.27	
Independent	Wu Pik-lung	34	0.63	
Majority		806	14.84	
Turnout		5,444	70.74	
Democratic win (new seat)				
