= Kai Long Court =

Housing estate in Hong Kong

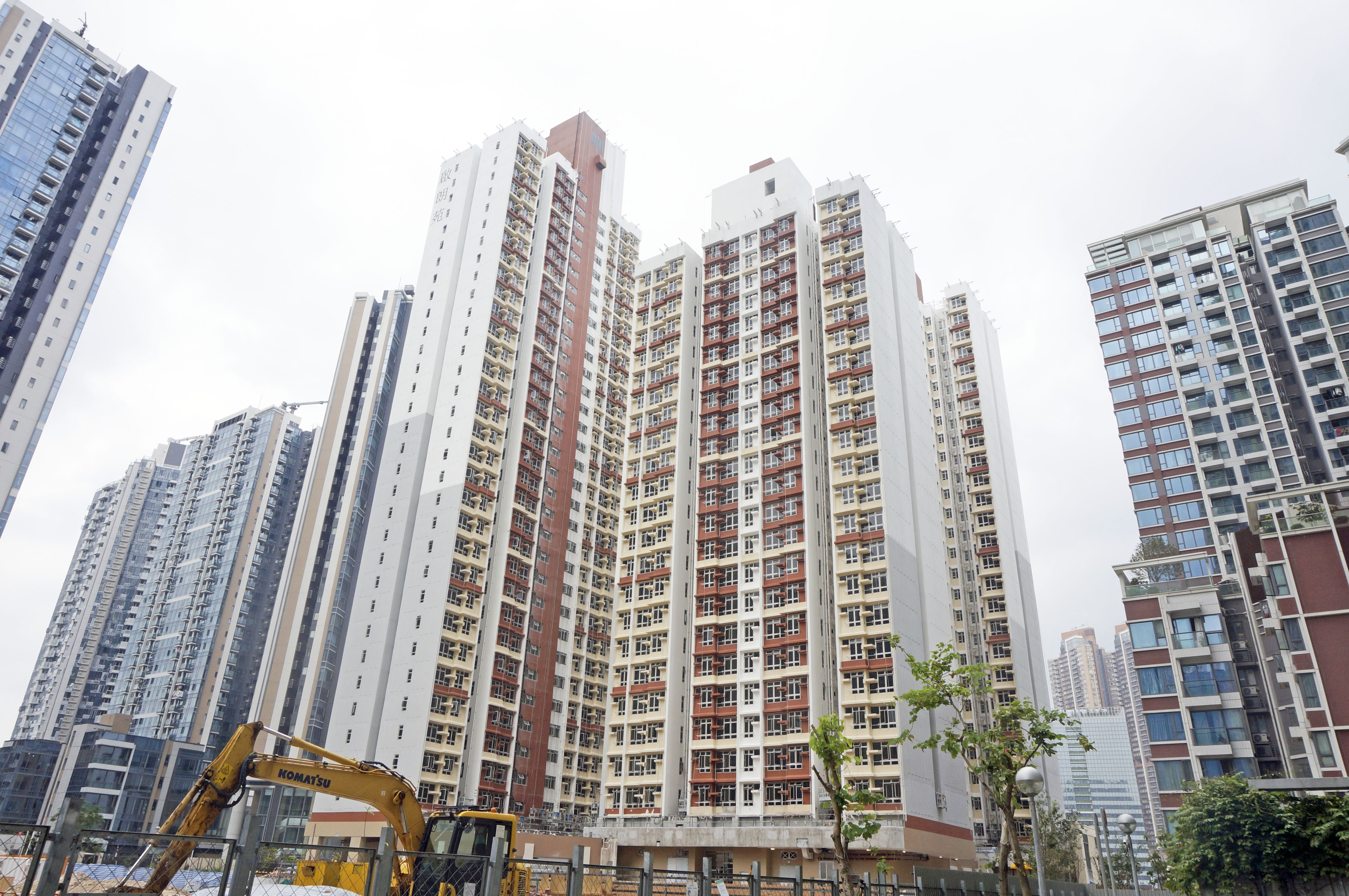
Kai Long Court

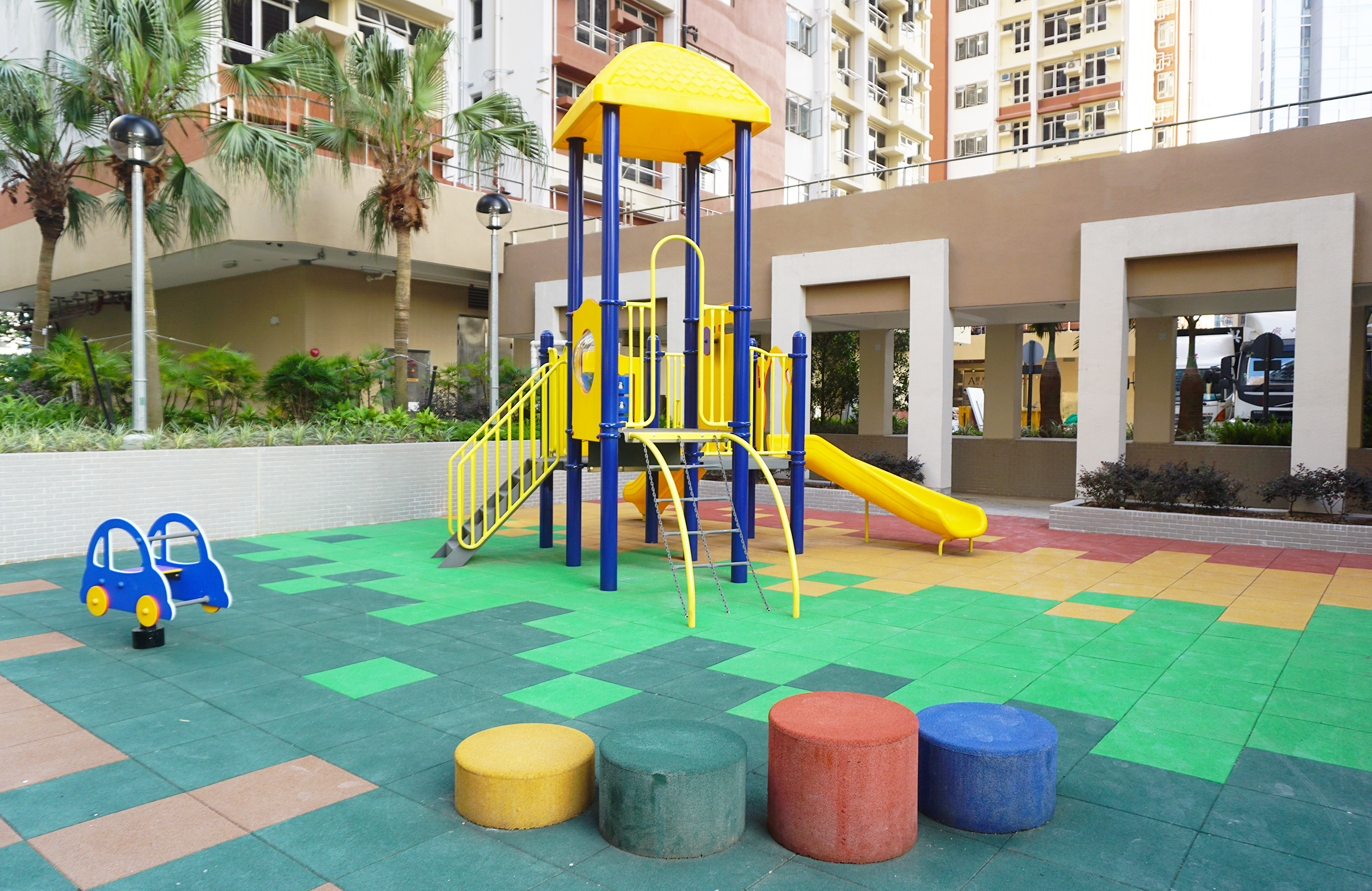
Children playground

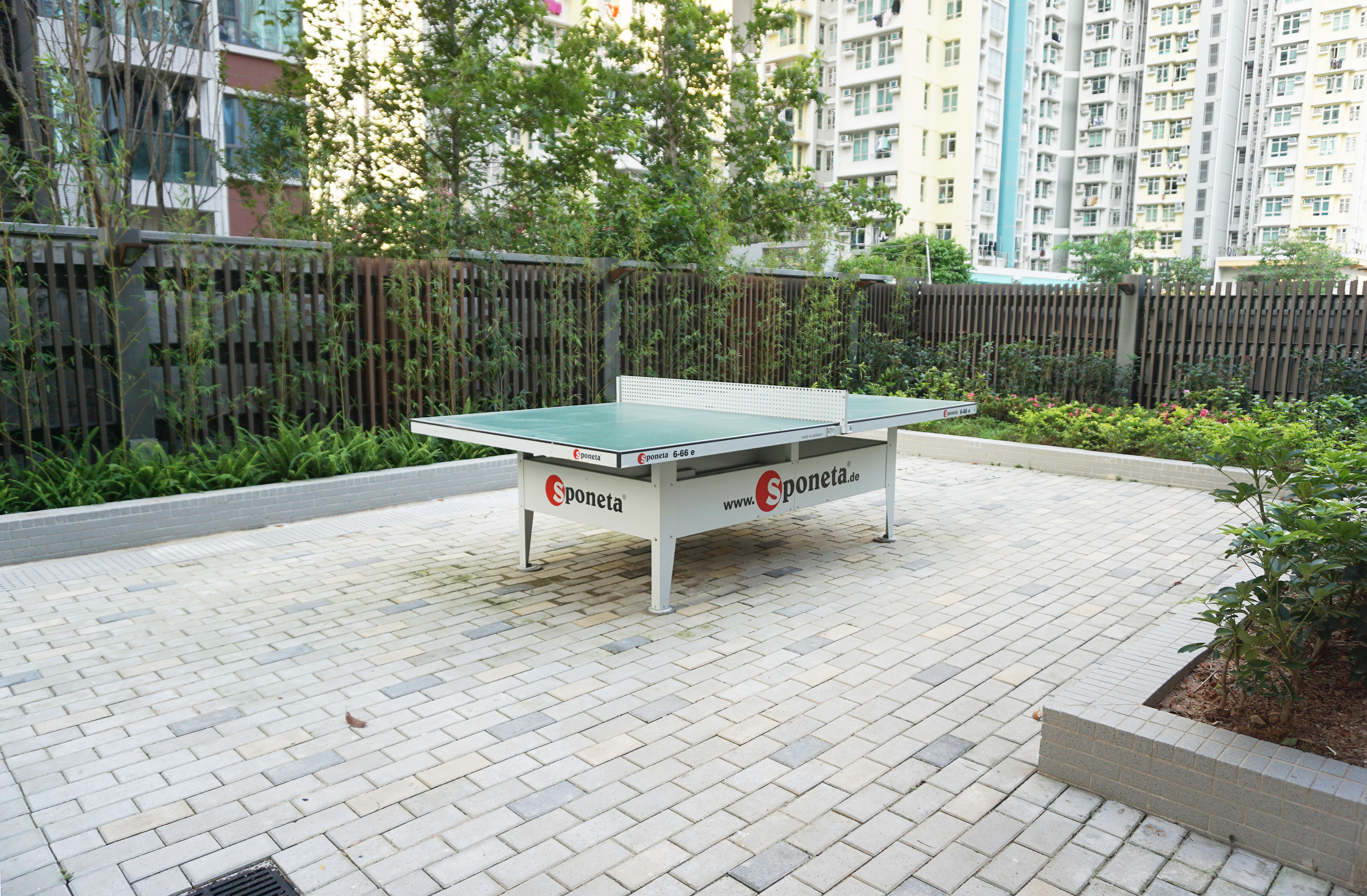
Table tennis table

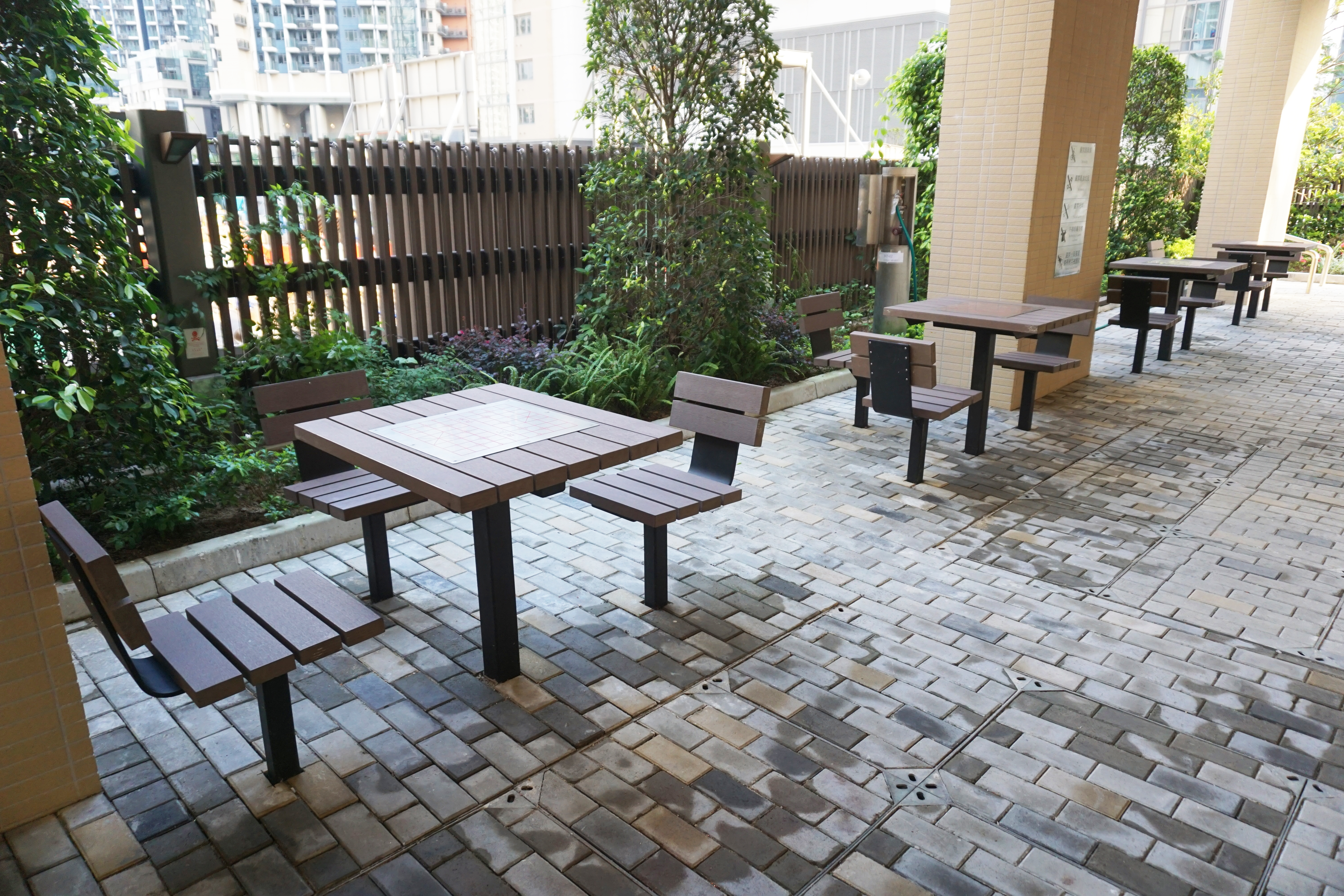
Chess area

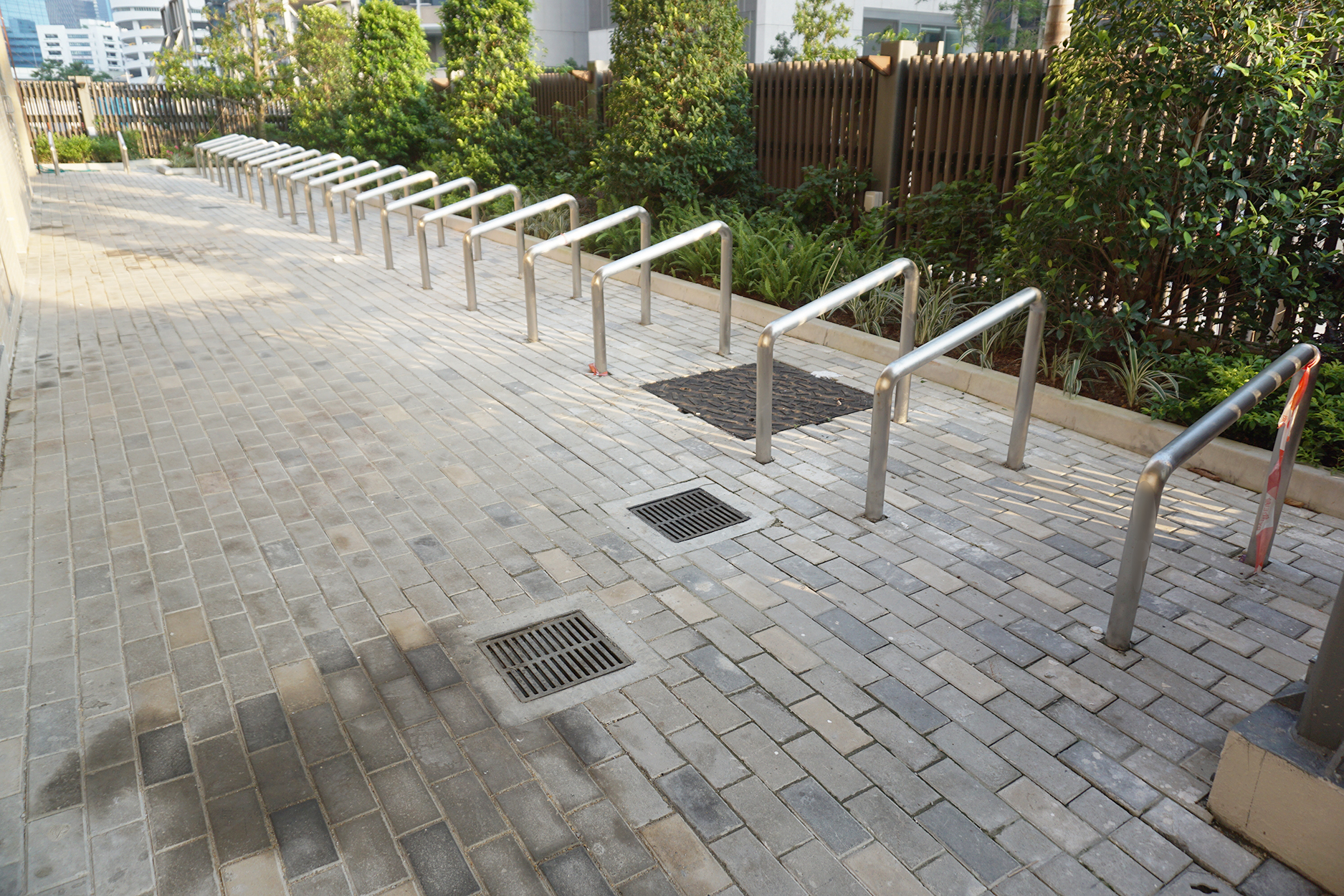
Bicycle parking space

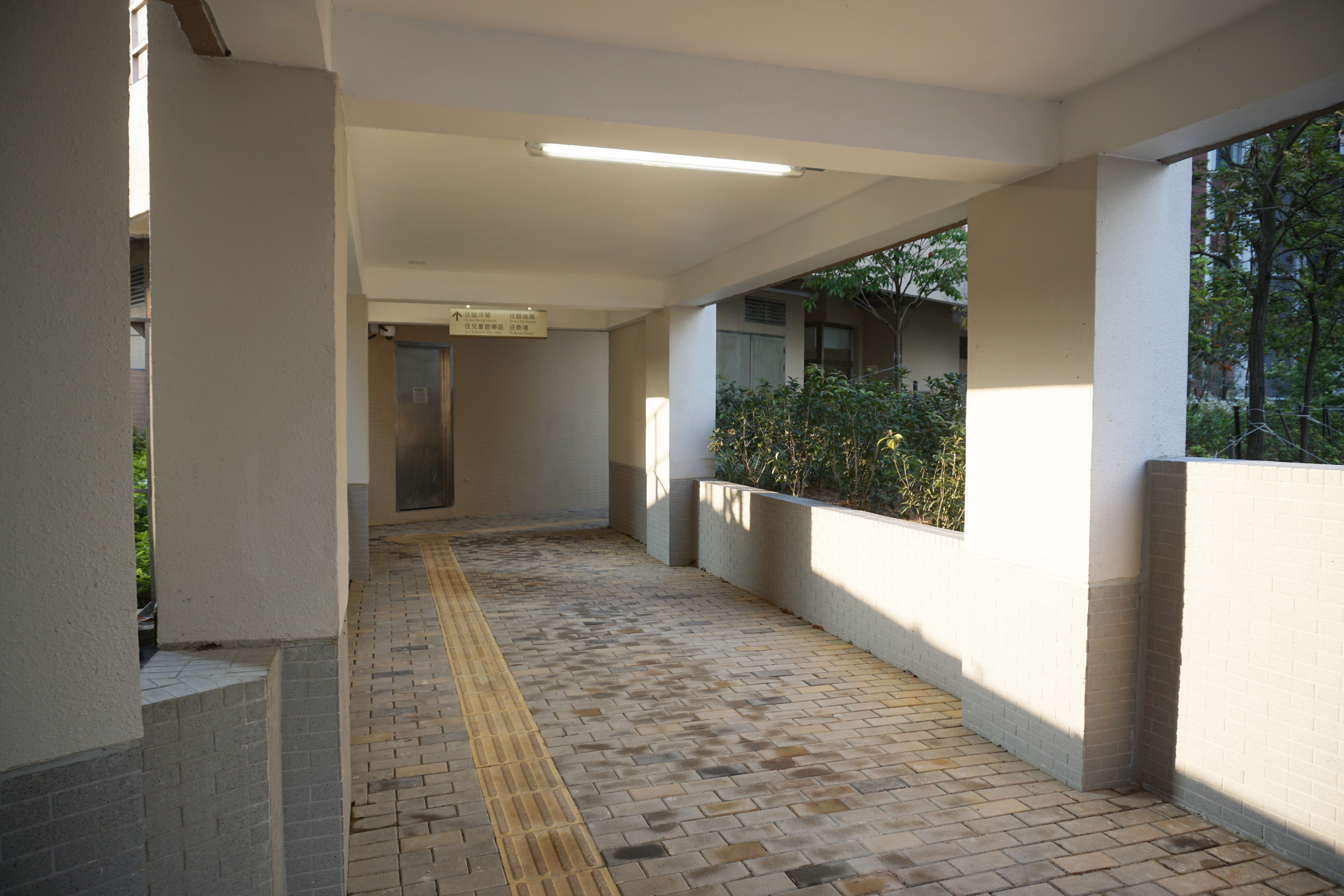
Covered pedestrian crossing

Kai Long Court (Chinese: 啟朗苑) is a Home Ownership Scheme (HOS) court developed by the Hong Kong Housing Authority and located at 18 Muk On Street, Kai Tak Development of Kowloon City District, Kowloon, Hong Kong. It commenced in March 2019.

The court has a site area of around 5,710 square metres, and comprises 3 residential blocks providing 683 residential units. A two-storey retail block will be constructed along the Station Square, with a short walking distance to MTR Kai Tak station.

The court was sold in March 2018 and had originally the highest-ever average HOS price of HK$9,755 per square foot in the HOS history. But later Carrie Lam, the Chief Executive of Hong Kong, decided to revise its price to HK$7,280 per square foot in average by ensuring at least 75% of flats, instead of the current 50%, were affordable.

== Blocks ==
Name	Type	Completion
Kai Yiu House (Block A)	Non-standard block	2019
Kai Yat House (Block B)	Non-standard block	2019
Kai Yeung House (Block C)	Non-standard block	2019

== Nearby Buildings ==
- Kai Tak station
- One Kai Tak
- Victoria Skye
- De Novo
- OASIS KAI TAK
- Kai Ching Estate
- Tak Long Estate
- Richland Gardens
- King Tai Court
