= Public housing estates in the Kai Tak development area =

Public housing in Kai Tak, Hong Kong

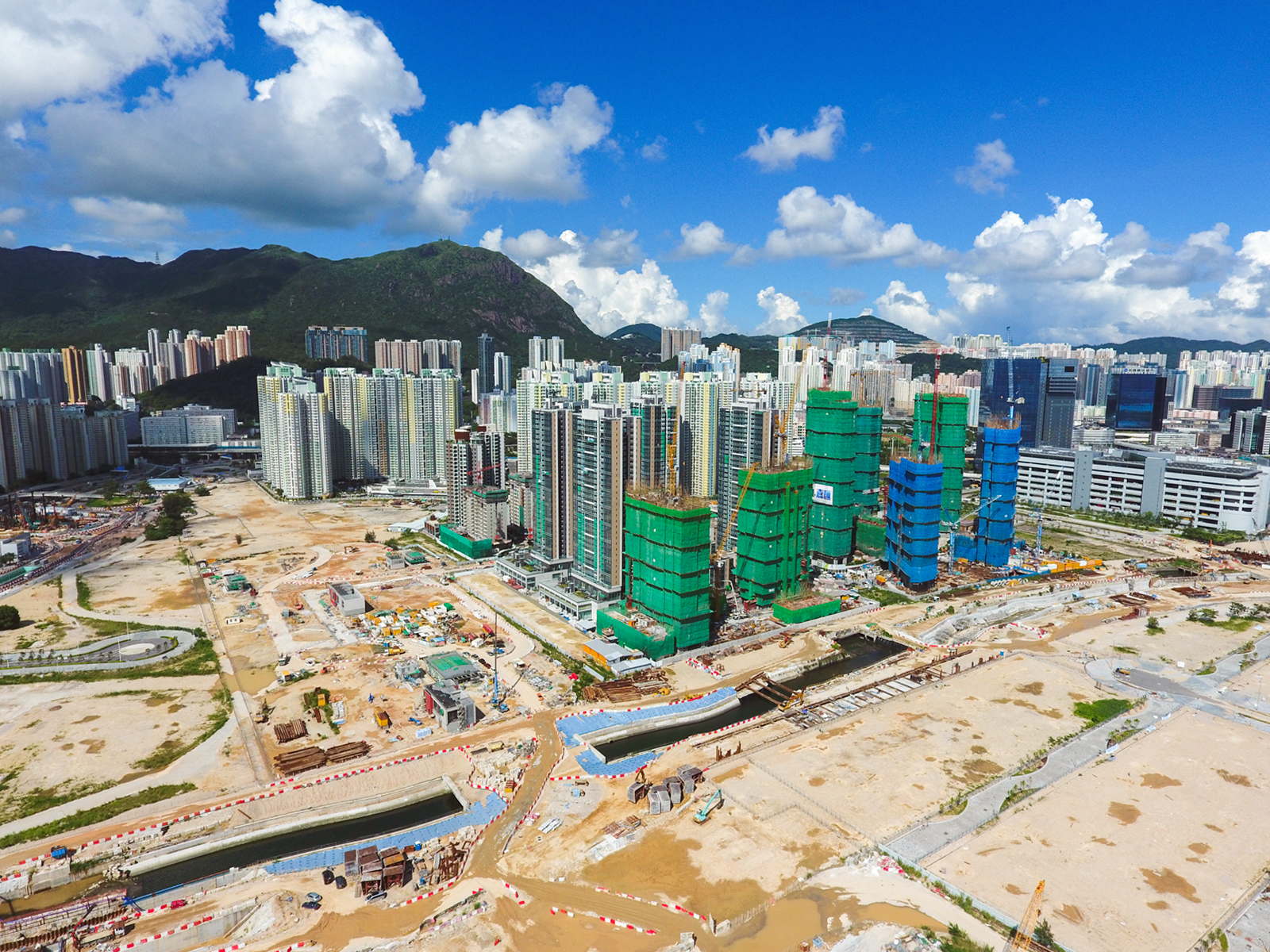
Kai Tak development area in 2017

The following is an overview of public housing estates in the Kai Tak development area, located in the Kowloon City District of Hong Kong. This list includes Home Ownership Scheme (HOS), Private Sector Participation Scheme (PSPS), and Tenants Purchase Scheme (TPS) estates.

== History ==
In 1998, the city's airport relocated from Kai Tak to Chek Lap Kok, clearing the way for a redevelopment of the Kai Tak lands. In 2006, the Planning Department outlined plans to build two new public estates on part of this brownfield site. The two estates, called Kai Ching (啟晴) and Tak Long (德朗), opened on the former north apron in 2013 and 2014 respectively.

== Overview ==
| Name | | Type | Inaug. | No. Blocks | No. Units | Notes |
| Kai Ching Estate | 啟晴邨 | Public | 2013 | 5 | 5,200 | |
| Tak Long Estate | 德朗邨 | Public | 2013 | 9 | 8,164 | |
| De Novo | 煥然壹居 | Resettlement | 2017 | 4 | 484 | Urban Renewal Authority Flat-for-Flat Scheme housing for residents displaced by urban renewal. |
| Kai Long Court | 啟朗苑 | HOS | 2019 | 2 | 683 | |

== Kai Ching Estate ==
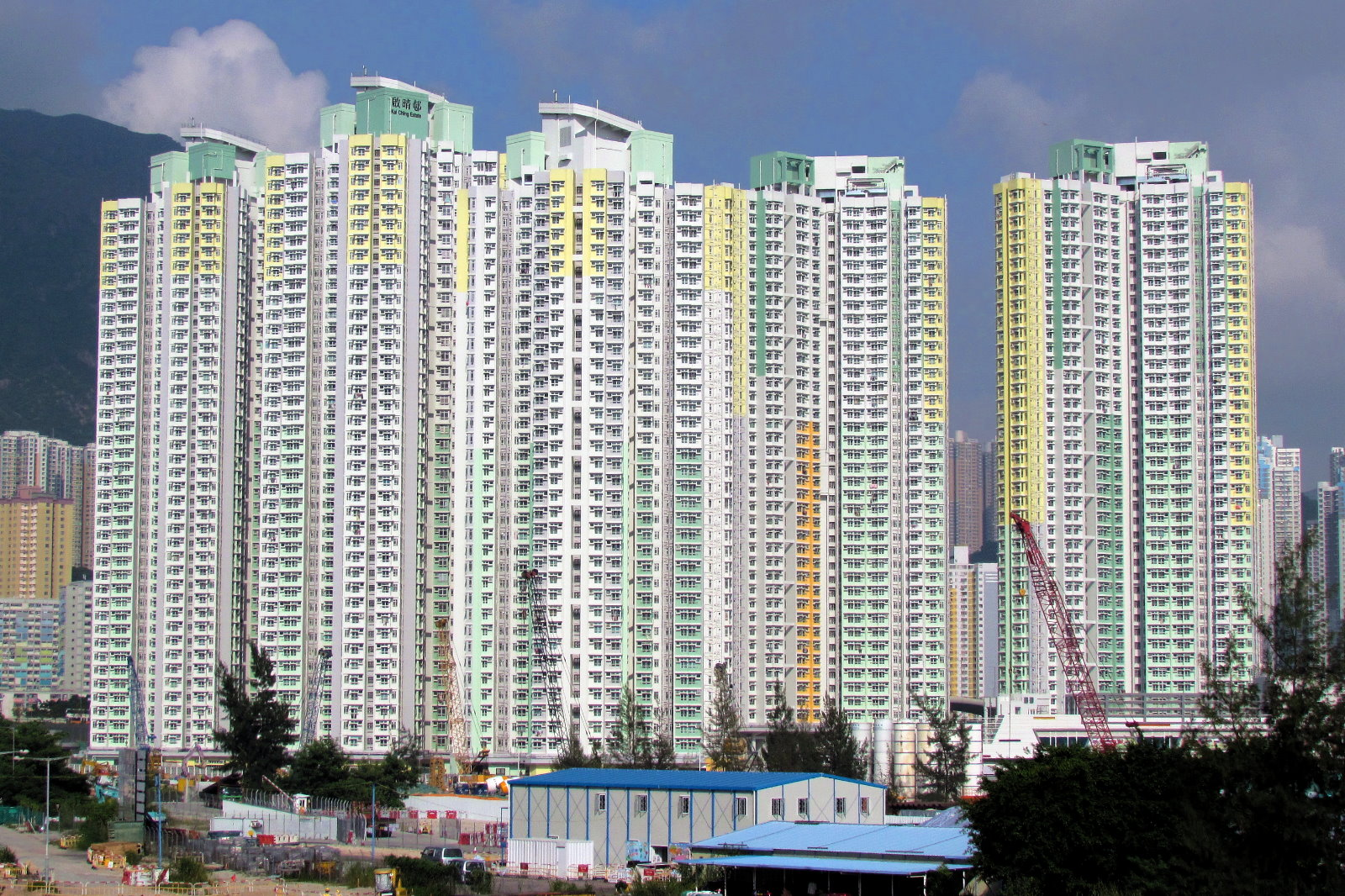
Kai Ching Estate

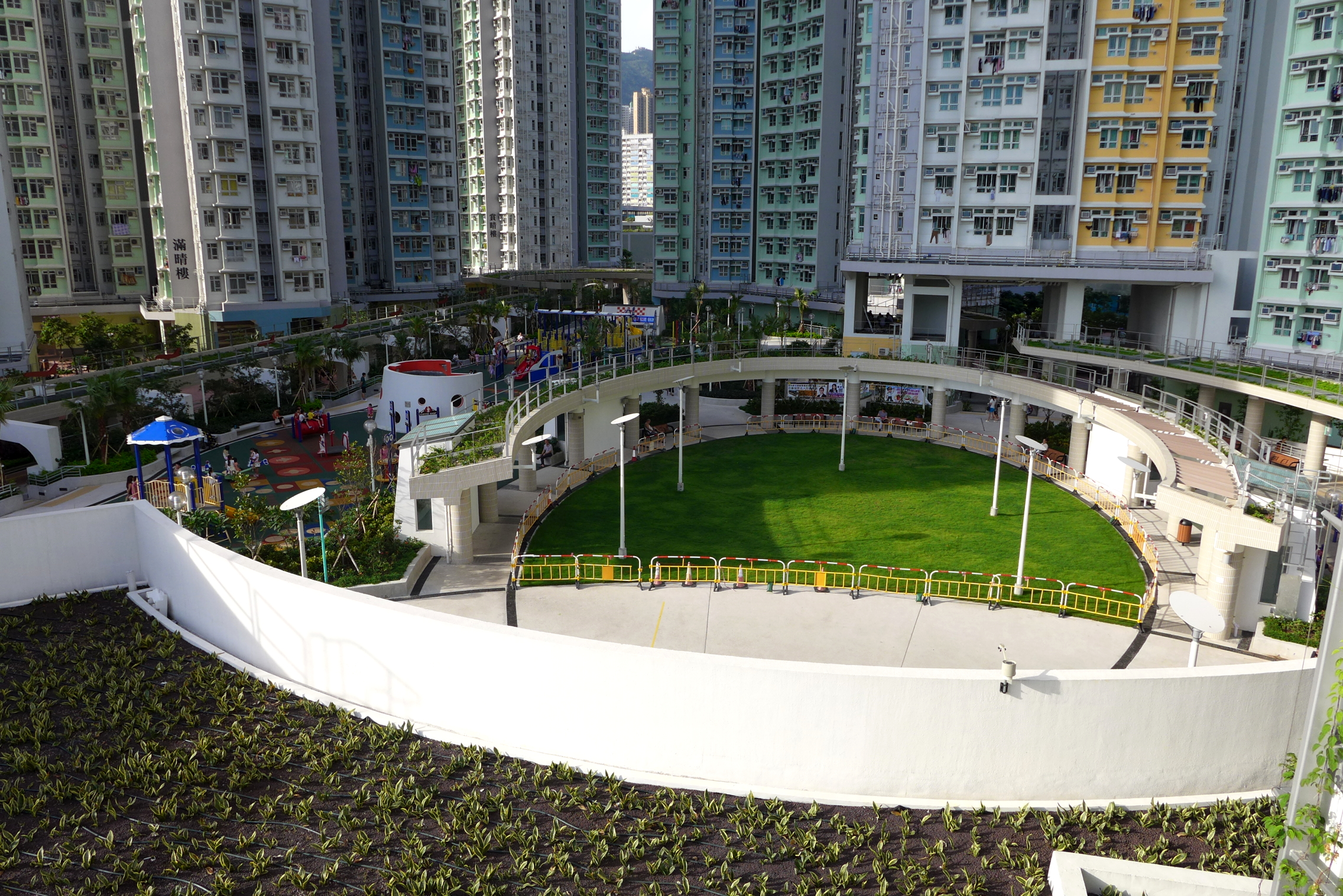
Open space inside estate

Kai Ching Estate (Chinese: 啟晴邨) consists of six residential buildings completed in 2013. It houses around 5,200 flats for 13,300 residents and shares the "Ching Long Shopping Centre" with Tak Long Estate. Kai Ching Estate was built by China State Construction Engineering (Hong Kong).

Like other public housing estates in Hong Kong, the construction of Kai Ching Estate made use of prefabricated components including precast facades and staircases, semi-precast slabs, and precast kitchens and bathrooms. Kai Ching was also a pilot estate for the use of precast water taps.

The estate incorporates a number of energy and water saving features. Renewable energy sources include solar panels on the housing block rooftops, and lift motors that can generate power when the lift is carrying a heavy load down, a light load up, or under braking conditions. A district cooling system cools non-domestic facilities including the shops, kindergartens, and estate offices. A rainwater collection system is used for irrigation.

In 2014, one resident of Lok Ching House shot and killed another resident, sparking a 12-hour standoff with police. The gunman, a mainland immigrant, shot himself and was declared dead in hospital. He was suspected of suffering from mental problems and had previously been jailed for assault.

In 2015, water samples from Kai Ching Estate were found to be contaminated with lead, sparking a citywide scandal and the discovery of contaminated drinking water at many other buildings. Pipe soldering samples taken from Kai Ching Estate contained 50 per cent lead. In addition, Legionella bacteria was discovered at Mun Ching House.

=== Houses ===
| English name | Chinese name | Type | Storeys | Completion |
|---|---|---|---|---|
| Hong Ching House | 康晴樓 | Non-standard block (Y-shaped) | 39 | 2013 |
| Lok Ching House | 樂晴樓 | Non-standard block (Y-shaped) | 40 | 2013 |
| Yan Ching House | 欣晴樓 | Non-standard block (Y-shaped) | 40 | 2013 |
| Sheung Ching House | 賞晴樓 | Non-standard block (cross-shaped) | 40 | 2013 |
| Mun Ching House | 滿晴樓 | Non-standard block (cross-shaped) | 40 | 2013 |
| Yuet Ching House | 悅晴樓 | Non-standard block (cross-shaped) | 35 | 2013 |

== Tak Long Estate ==
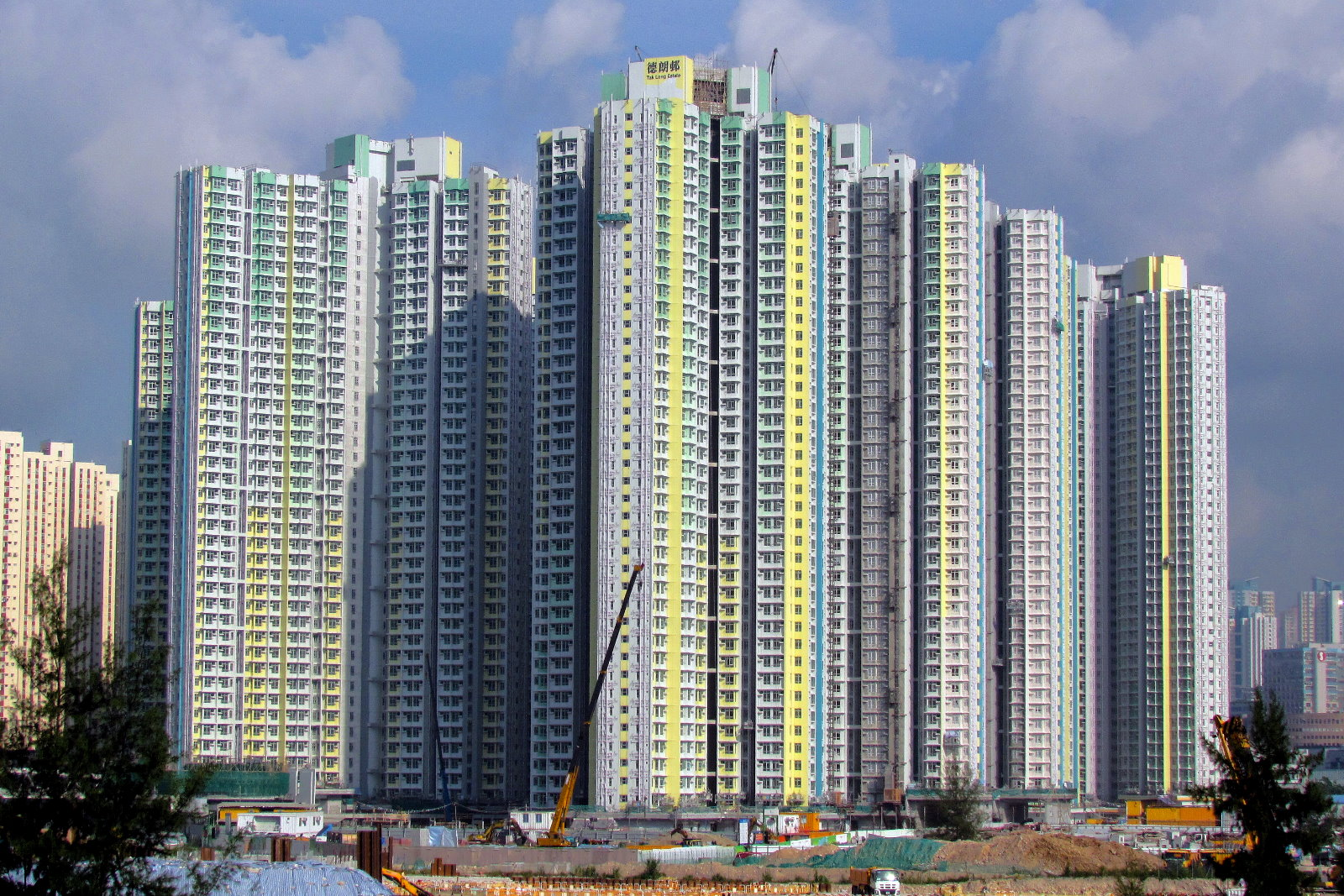
Tak Long Estate

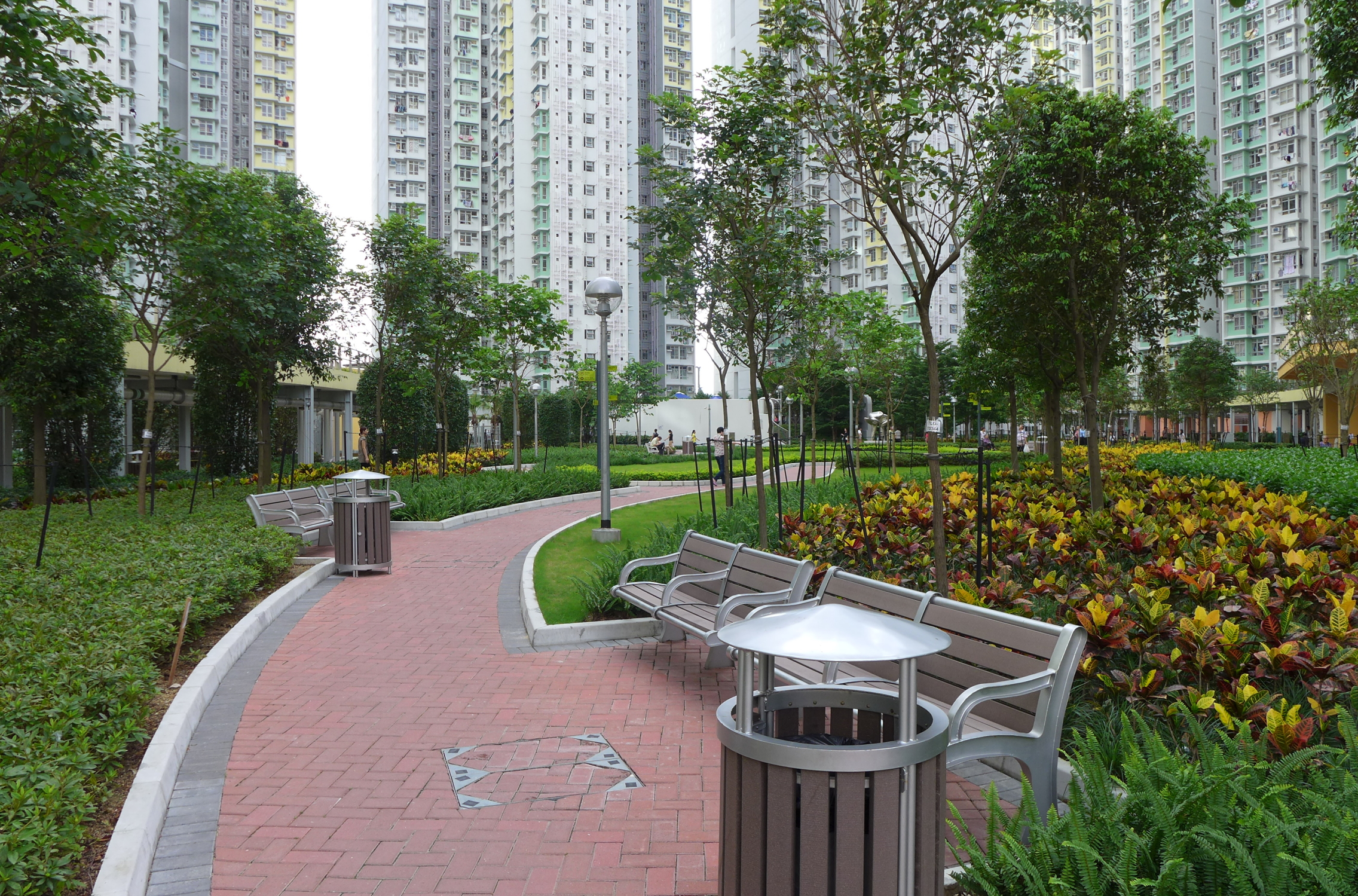
Landscape Garden

Tak Long Estate (Chinese: 德朗邨) consists of nine residential blocks completed in 2013. It shares the "Ching Long Shopping Centre" with Kai Ching Estate.

=== Houses ===
| English name | Chinese name | Type | Storeys | Completion |
|---|---|---|---|---|
| Tak Pui House | 德珮樓 | Non-standard block (cross-shaped) | 35 | 2013 |
| Tak Loong House | 德瓏樓 | Non-standard block (cross-shaped) | 40 | 2013 |
| Tak Ying House | 德瑩樓 | Non-standard block (cross-shaped) | 40 | 2013 |
| Tak Cheung House | 德璋樓 | Non-standard block (cross-shaped) | 40 | 2013 |
| Tak Kei House | 德琦樓 | Non-standard block (cross-shaped) | 40 | 2013 |
| Tak Shan House | 德珊樓 | Non-standard block (cross-shaped) | 40 | 2013 |
| Tak Yiu House | 德瑤樓 | Non-standard block (cross-shaped) | 40 | 2013 |
| Tak Yu House | 德瑜樓 | Non-standard block (Y-shaped) | 40 | 2013 |
| Tak Sui House | 德瑞樓 | Non-standard block (Y-shaped) | 40 | 2013 |

Tak Long Estate is in Primary One Admission (POA) School Net 34. Within the school net are multiple aided schools (operated independently but funded with government money) and two government schools: Farm Road Government Primary School and Ma Tau Chung Government Primary School.

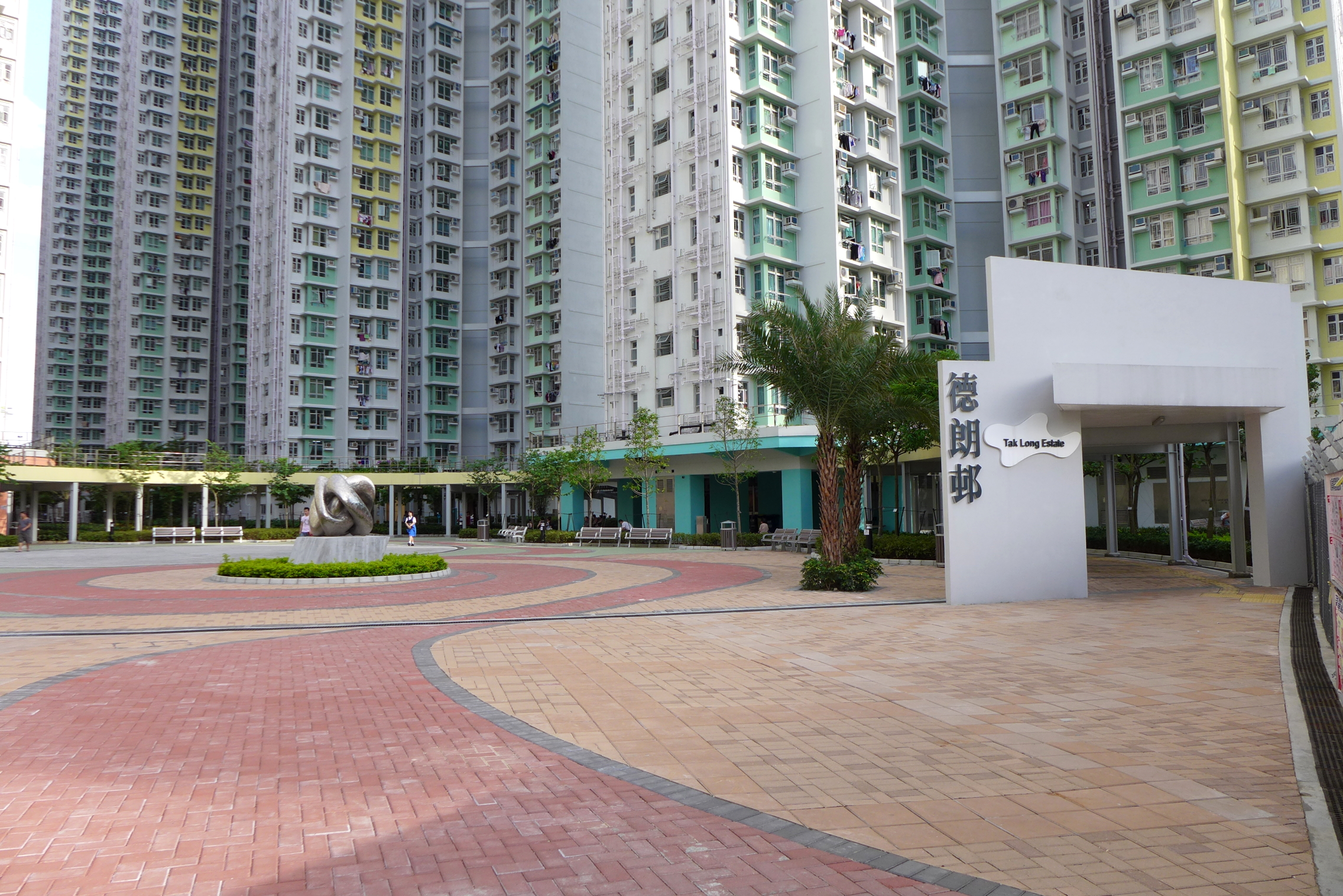
Entry Plaza

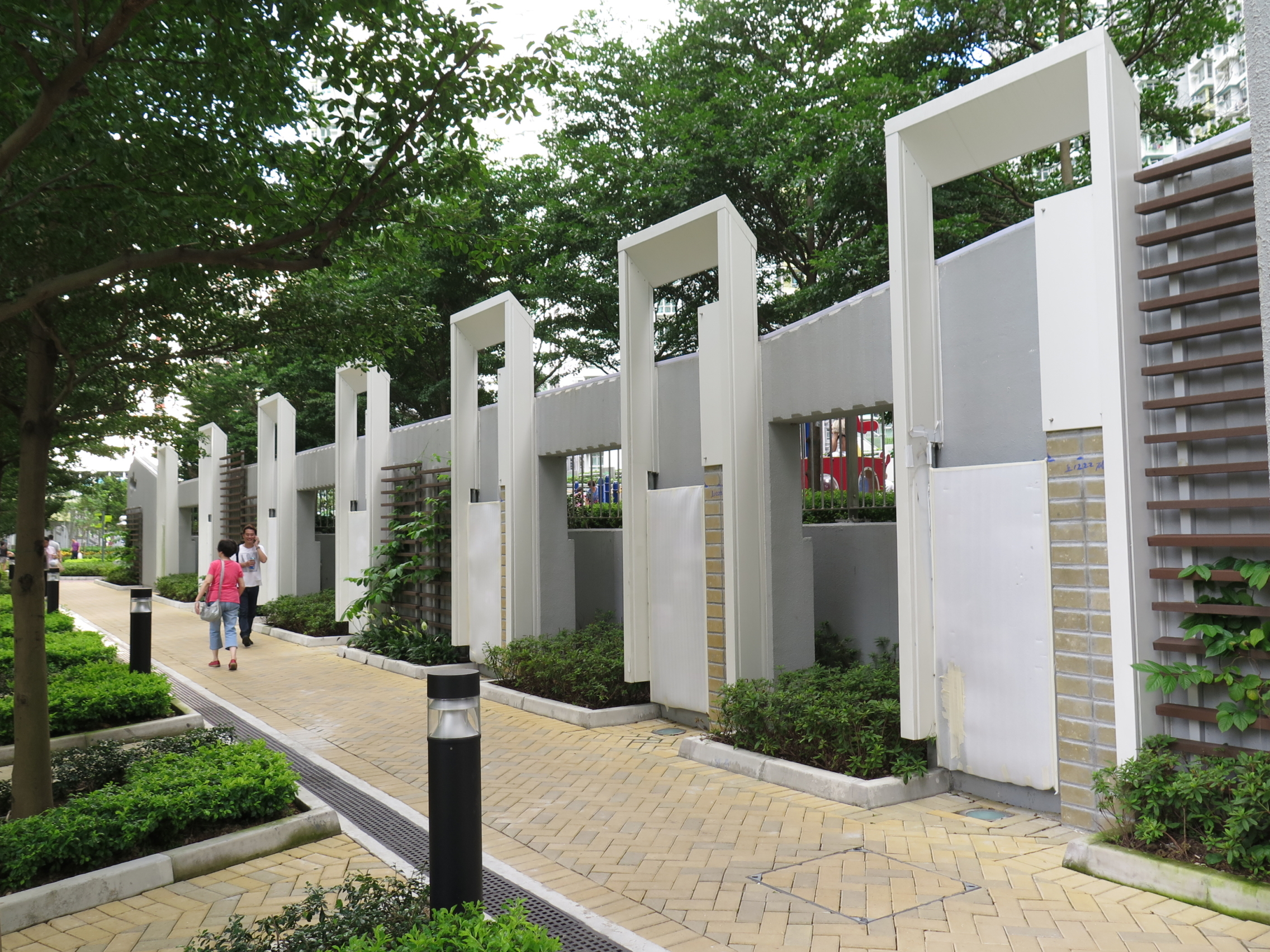
Historical Gallery

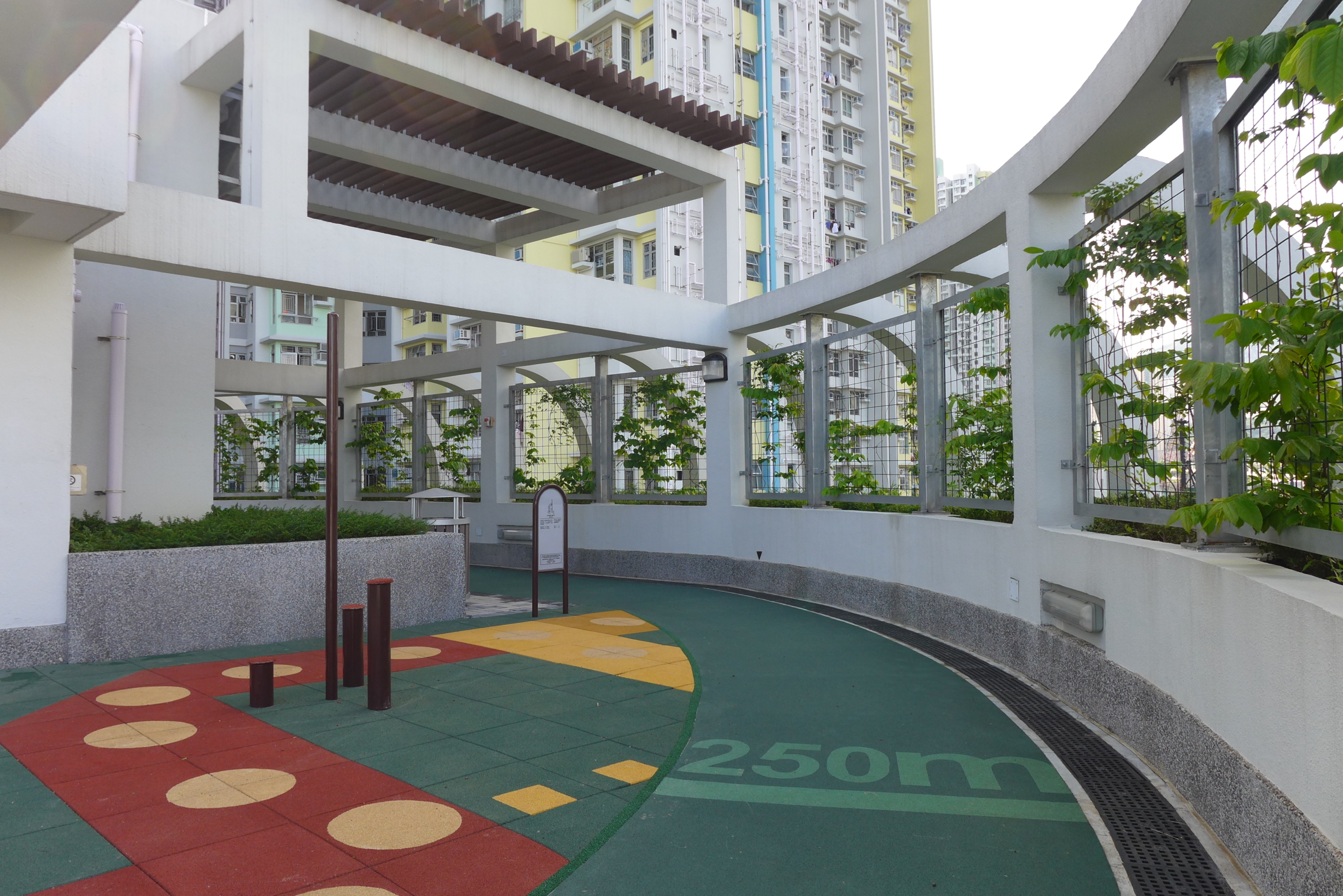
Carpark Podium Jogging Track

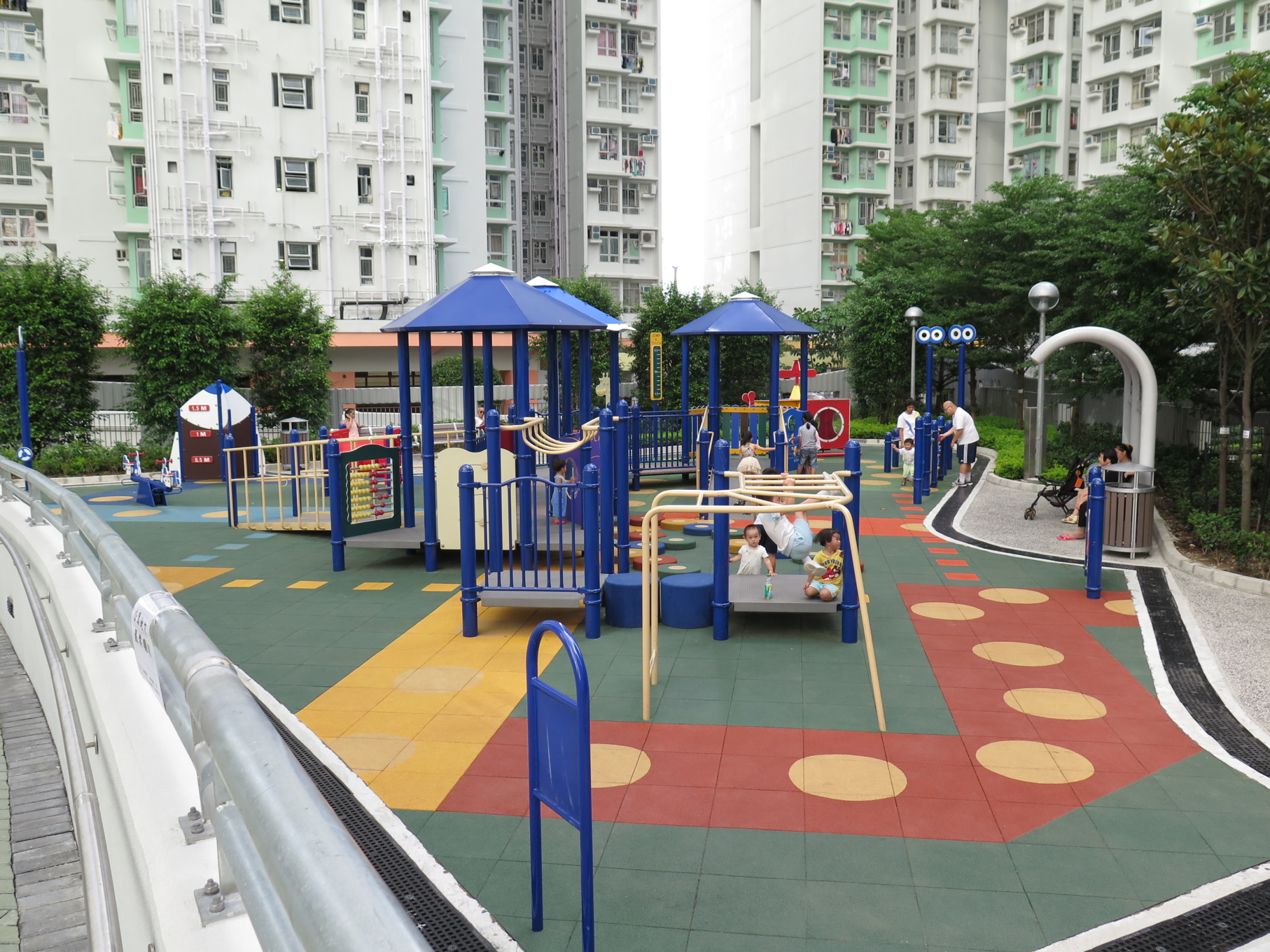
Children Playground

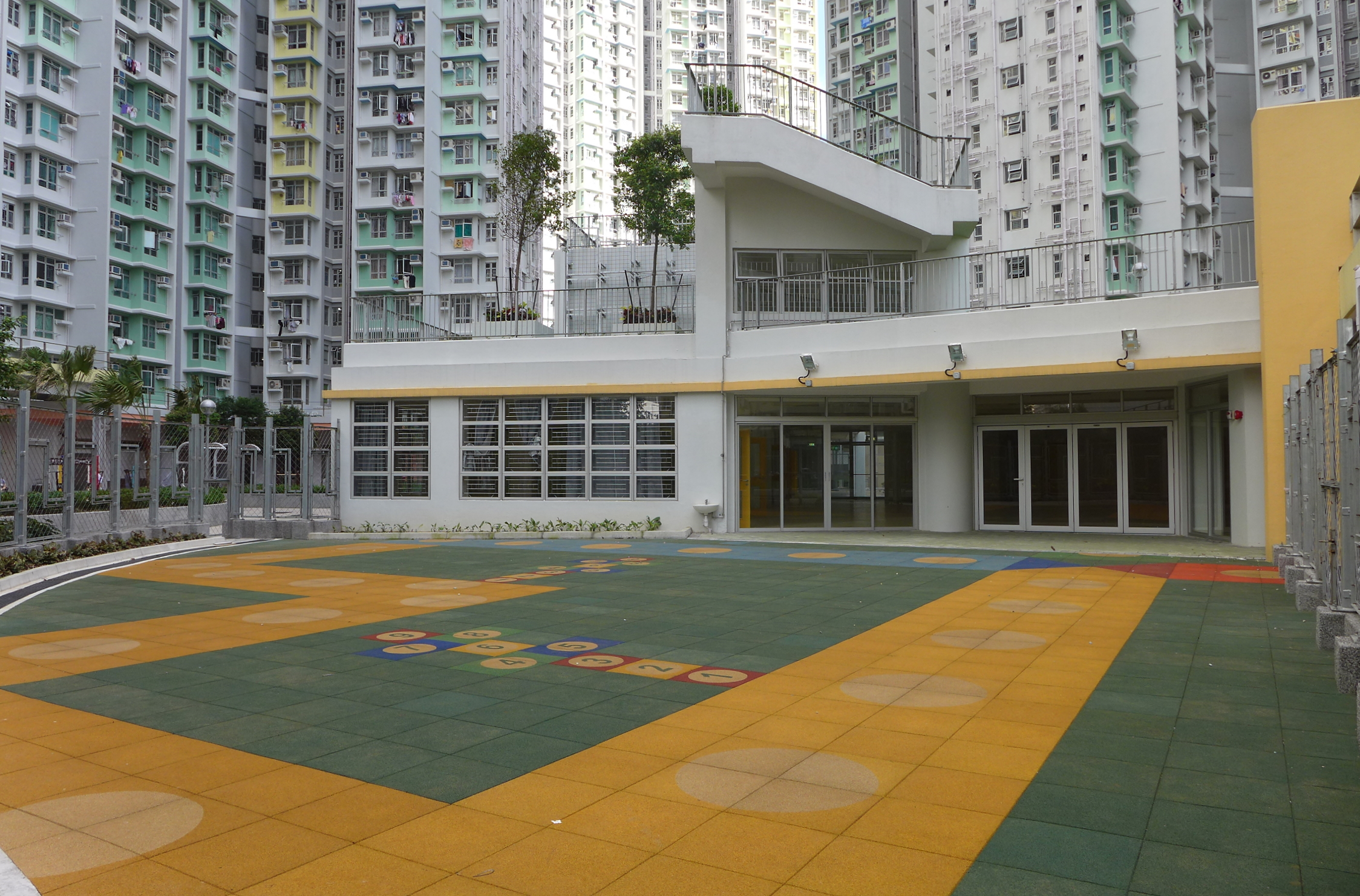
Kindergarten

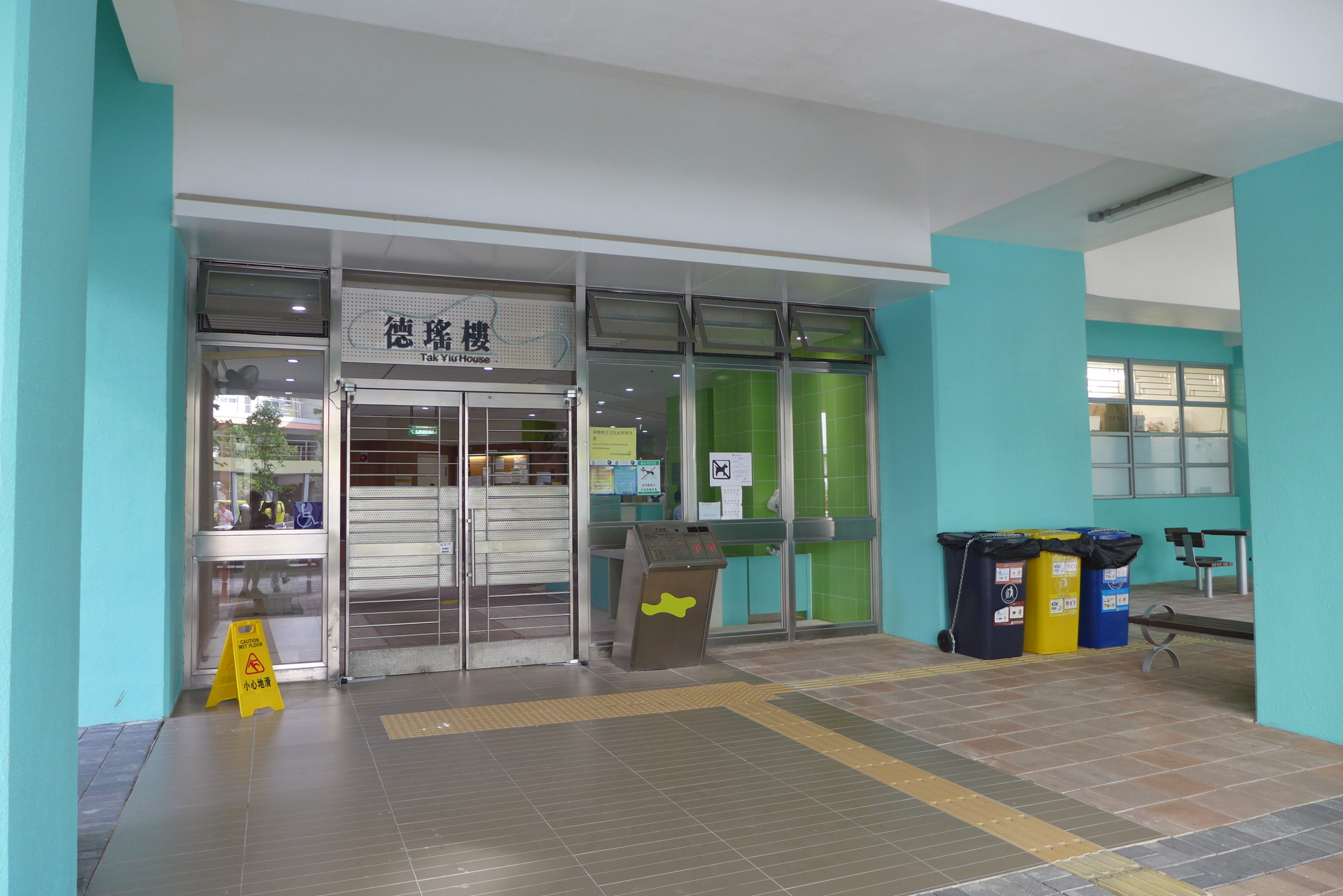
Tak Yiu House Entrance

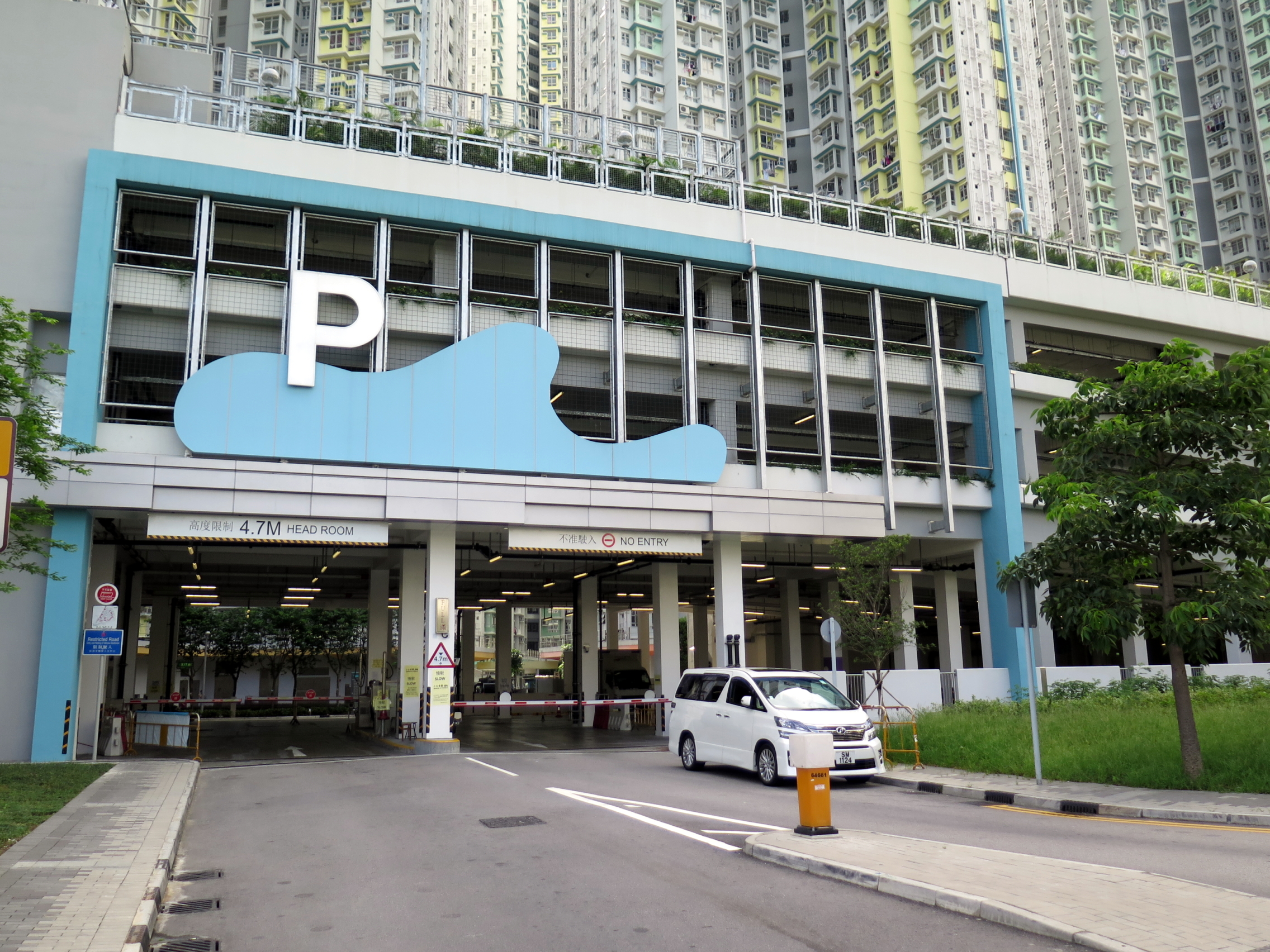
Carpark

== De Novo ==
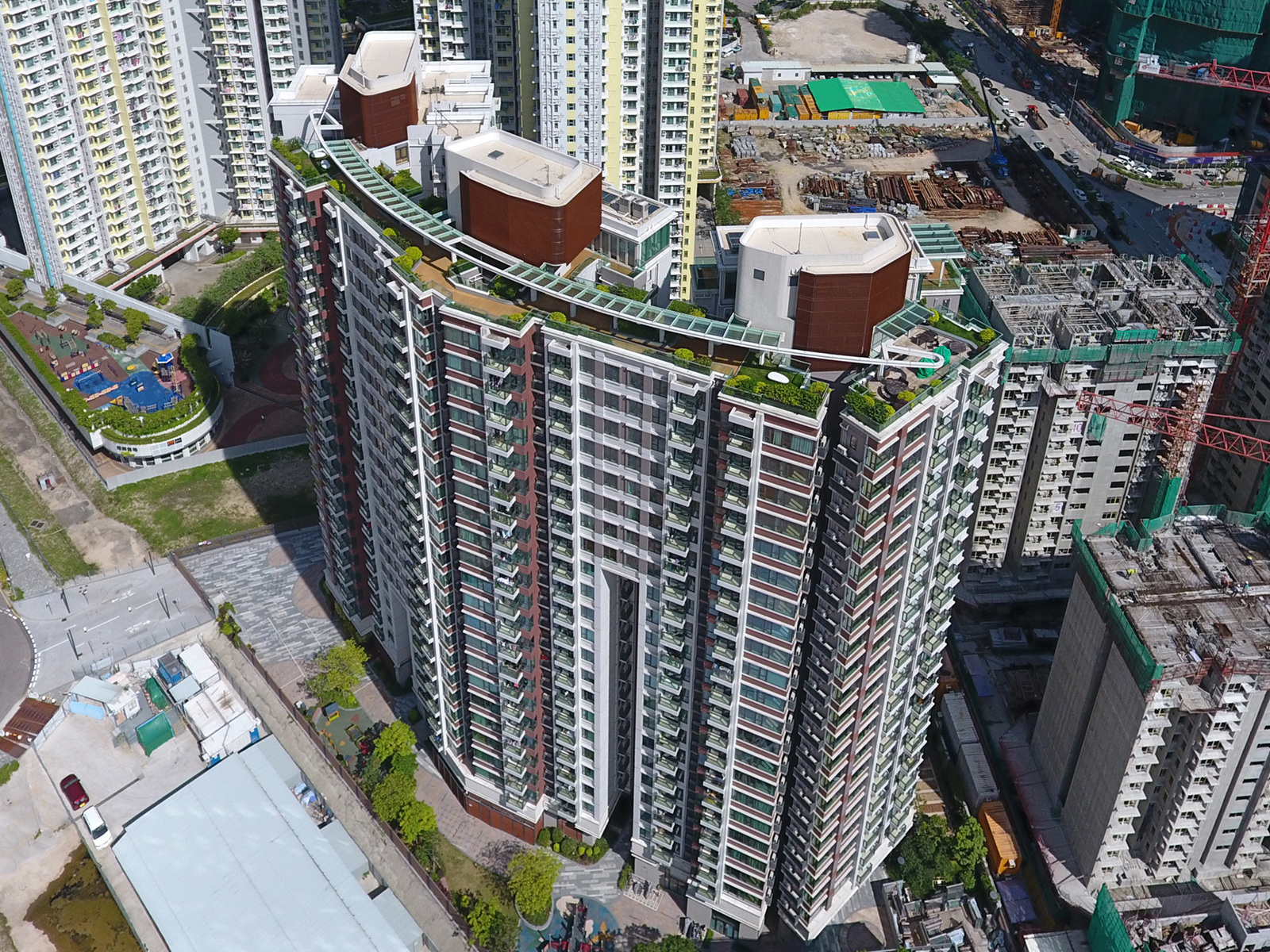
De Novo (2017)

De Novo (Chinese: 煥然壹居) is a housing estate of the Urban Renewal Authority (URA) comprising four residential blocks and a two-storey commercial complex. It provides 484 flats of between 330 and 670 square feet each. Urban renewal in Hong Kong typically involves wholesale demolition of old urban districts and their replacement with high-end commercial and housing developments. Therefore, this project is intended to accommodate residents displaced by urban renewal projects. De Novo is being constructed directly to the west of Tak Long Estate.

In April 2015, it was reported that some of the flats at De Novo will be offered up for subsidised sale at about 75 per cent of the market value. The scheme will target families who cannot afford private housing, but who are too rich to qualify for the Home Ownership Scheme.

In light of the 2015 lead-in-drinking water scandal, the URA assured prospective buyers that plumbers used silver welding materials, and that experts were on hand to ensure no materials with lead were used. However, the Apple Daily newspaper took samples from each of De Novo's four blocks and found lead contamination up to 30 per cent above the acceptable limit.

== Transportation ==
The estates are in proximity to Kai Tak station of the Mass Transit Railway. In February 2013, five of the eventual 25 pedestrian links to the Kai Tai development area were completed. Four bus routes will also service the estates.

Kai Tak Cruise Terminal is also located nearby.

== See also ==
- Public housing in Hong Kong
- List of public housing estates in Hong Kong
