= Kwai Hing Estate =

Public housing estate in Kwai Chung, Hong Kong

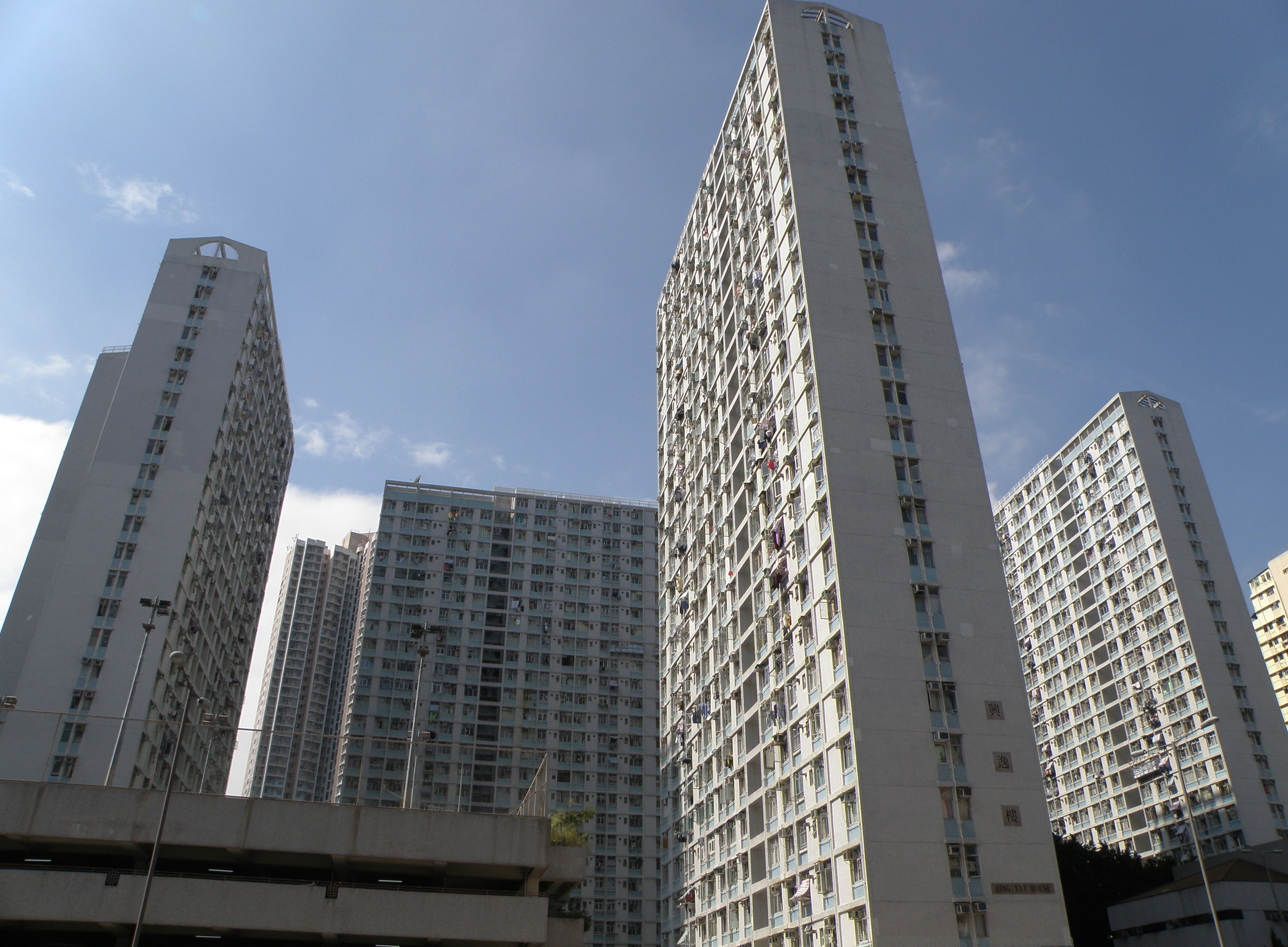
- Kwai Hing Estate
- Interactive map of Kwai Hing Estate

General information
- Location: 2 Wo Kwai Lane, Kwai Chung; New Territories, Hong Kong
- Coordinates: 22.365822°N 114.132148°E
- Status: Completed
- Category: Public rental housing
- Population: 6,953 (2016)
- No. of blocks: 4
- No. of units: 1,528

Construction
- Constructed: 1970; 56 years ago (Before reconstruction); 1991; 35 years ago (After reconstruction)
- Authority: Hong Kong Housing Authority

Kwai Hing Estate (Chinese: 葵興邨) is a public housing estate in Kwai Hing, Kwai Chung, New Territories, Hong Kong. It was built in the valley of Gin Drinkers Bay, later the town centre of Kwai Chung. Kwai Hing station is named after the name of the estate. It comprises 4 buildings with a total of 400 rental units (TPS units excluded) and 1 shopping arcade.

Kwai Chun Court (葵俊苑) is a Home Ownership Scheme court in Kwai Chung, near Kwai Hing Estate. It has 3 blocks built in 1995.

== Background ==
Before redevelopment, it consisted of 5 buildings which were completed between 1970 and 1972. In 1985, the Housing Authority announced that the strength of the concrete in blocks 3, 4 and 5 of Kwai Hing Estate were below standard. All the blocks were later demolished between 1988 and 1992 to cope with the estate redevelopment. The estate was later redeveloped with 5 buildings between 1991 and 1992. The estate joined the Tenants Purchase Scheme (TPS) in 2002 and is currently managed by the Owners' Corporation.

== Houses ==
=== Kwai Hing Estate ===
Name	Chinese name	Building type	Completed
Hing Kok House	興國樓	Linear 1	1991
Hing Yat House	興逸樓	Linear 1	1991
Hing Fuk House	興福樓	Linear 1	1992
Hing Lok House	興樂樓	Linear 1	1992

=== Kwai Chun Court ===
Name	Chinese name	Building type	Completed
Kwai Cheong House	葵昌閣	NCB (Ver.1984)	1995
Kwai Yue House	葵裕閣	NCB (Ver.1984)	1995
Kwai Fung House	葵豐閣	NCB (Ver.1984)	1995

== Demographics ==
According to the 2016 by-census, Kwai Hing Estate had a population of 3,908 while Kwai Chun Court had a population of 3,045. Altogether the population amounts to 6,953.

== Politics ==
Kwai Hing Estate and Kwai Chun Court are located in Kwai Hing constituency of the Kwai Tsing District Council. It is currently represented by Leung Chi-shing, who was elected in the 2019 elections.

== See also ==
- Public housing estates in Kwai Chung
