= Kwai Luen Estate =

Public housing estate in Kwai Chung, Hong Kong

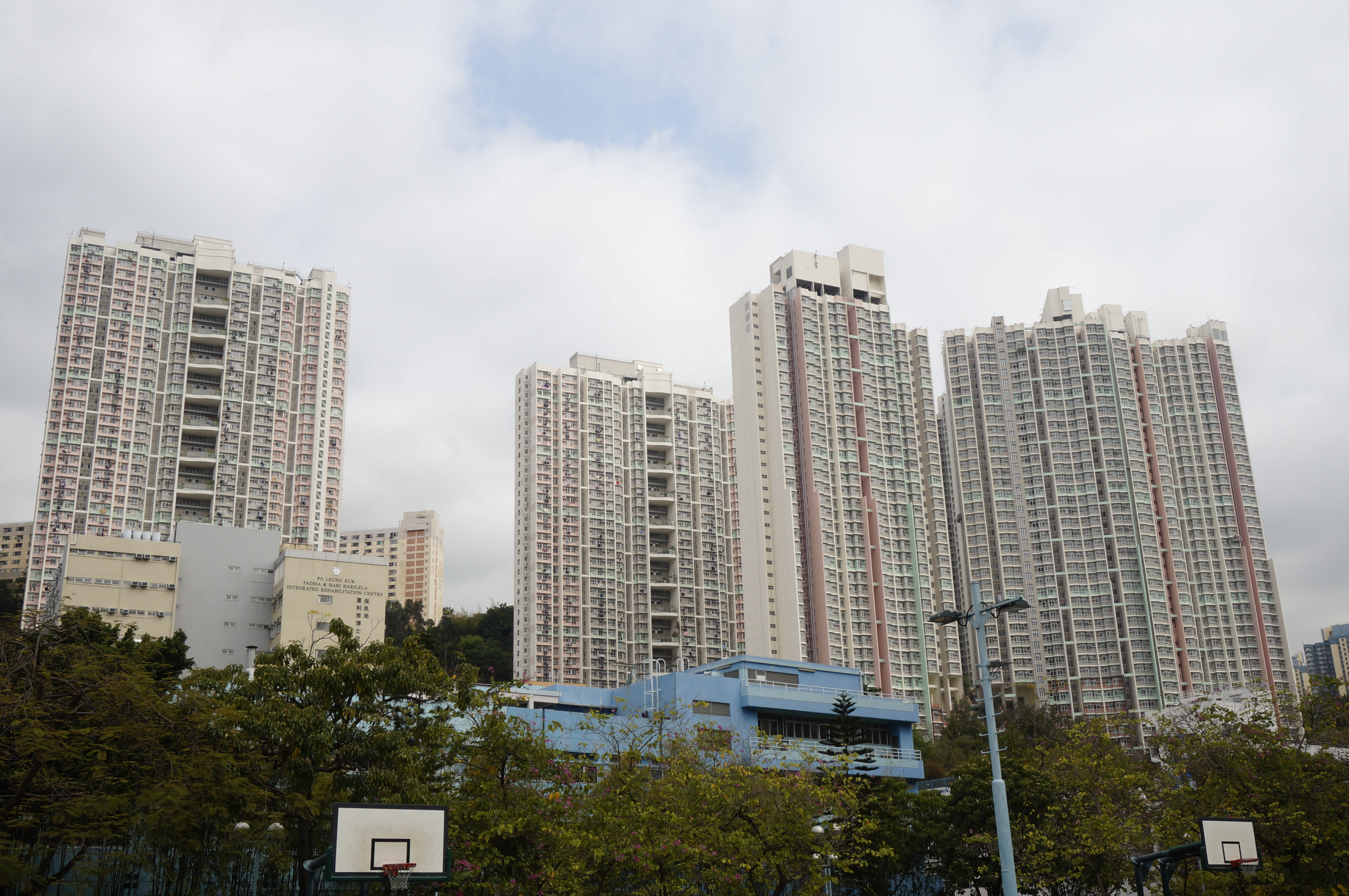
- Kwai Luen Estate
- Interactive map of Kwai Luen Estate

General information
- Location: 80 Kwai Luen Road, Kwai Shing; 323 Kwai Shing Circuit, Kwai Shing; Kwai Chung; New Territories, Hong Kong
- Coordinates: 22.3624461°N 114.1253651°E
- Status: Completed
- Category: Public rental housing
- Population: 7,616 (2016)
- No. of blocks: 4
- No. of units: 2,977

Construction
- Constructed: 2011; 15 years ago
- Authority: Hong Kong Housing Authority

Kwai Luen Estate (Chinese: 葵聯邨) is a public housing estate in Kwai Shing, Kwai Chung, New Territories, Hong Kong. It consists of four residential blocks completed in 2011 and 2014 respectively. It was one of the public housing estates detected to have excessive lead contents in its water supply in 2015.

== Houses ==
Name	Chinese name	Building type	Completed
Luen Hei House	聯喜樓	Non-standard	2011
Luen Yan House	聯欣樓	Non-standard	2011
Luen Yat House	聯逸樓	Non-standard	2014
Luen Yuet House	聯悅樓	Non-standard	2014

== Demographics ==
According to the 2016 by-census, Kwai Luen Estate had a population of 7,616. The median age was 36 and the majority of residents (98.7 per cent) were of Chinese ethnicity. The average household size was 2.5 people. The median monthly household income of all households (i.e. including both economically active and inactive households) was HK$17,000.

== Politics ==
Kwai Luen Estate is located in Kwai Luen constituency of the Kwai Tsing District Council. It was formerly represented by Ng Kim-sing, who was elected in the 2019 elections until July 2021.

== See also ==
- Public housing estates in Kwai Chung
