= Kwai Hing =

Coordinates: 22.36314°N 114.13134°E

- Traditional Chinese: 葵興
- Simplified Chinese: 葵兴
- Cantonese Yale: Kwàih hīng
Transcriptions
Standard Mandarin
- Hanyu Pinyin: Kuíxīng
Hakka
- Romanization: Kwi2 hin1
Yue: Cantonese
- Yale Romanization: Kwàih hīng
- Jyutping: Kwai4 hing1

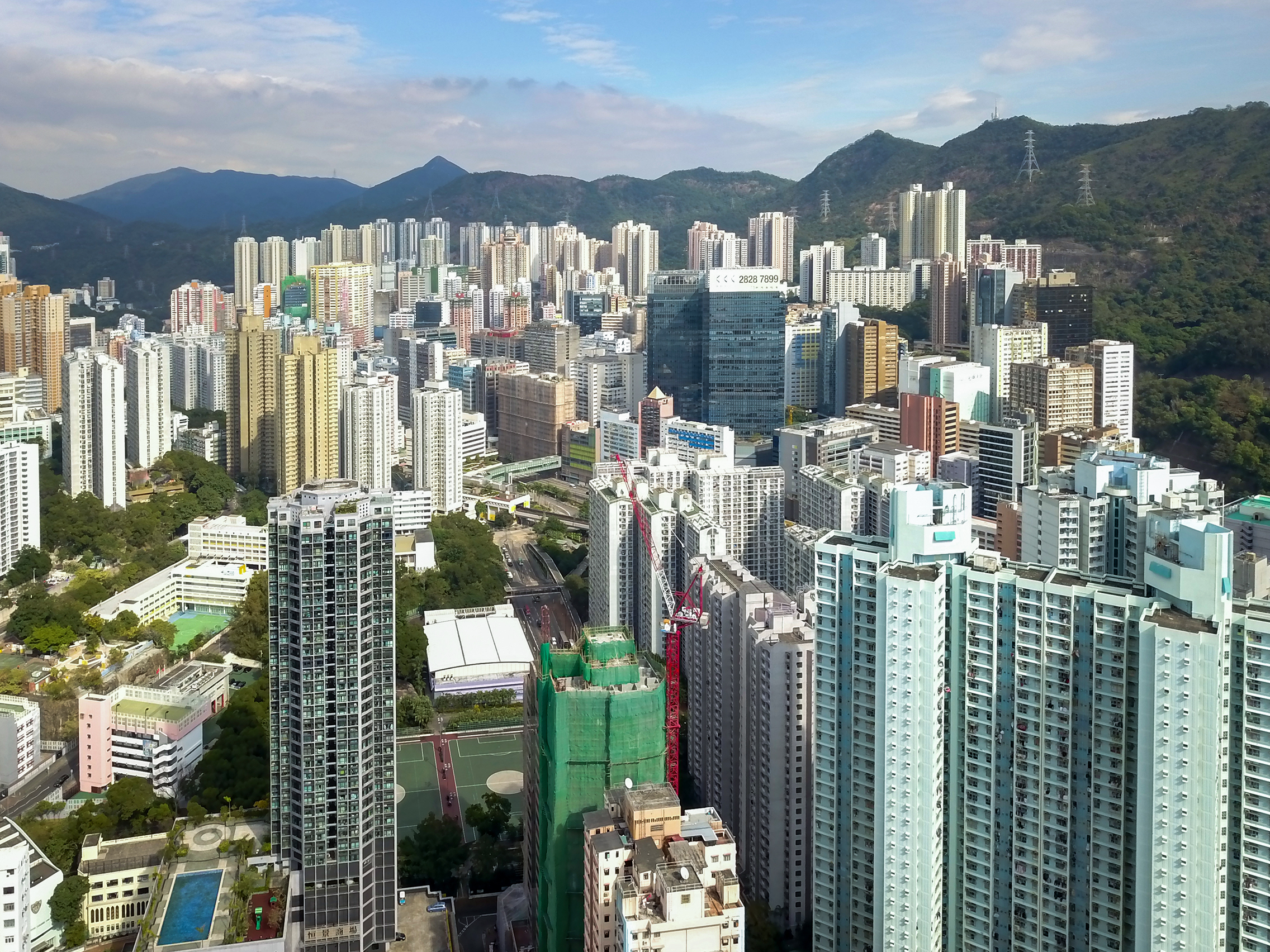
Kwai Hing

Kwai Hing is an area of Kwai Chung Town, Hong Kong. Its main residential area extends to North Kwai Chung in the north and east, Kwai Fong in the south, and Kwai Chung Estate to the west. It is part of the reclamation of Gin Drinkers Bay in 1960s. It is administrated by Kwai Tsing District Council. It is named after Kwai Hing Estate, a public housing estate in Kwai Chung.

== Demographics ==
According to the 2016 by-Census, Kwai Hing has a population of 18,005. 94% of the population is of Chinese ethnicity, and median monthly domestic household income is HK$ 20,000.

== Shopping malls ==
- New Kwai Hing Plaza
- Kwai Chung Centre
- Kwai Hing Shopping Centre

== Recreation ==
- Kwai Hing Government Offices
- North Kwai Chung Public Library
- Osman Ramju Sadick Memorial Sports Centre

== Education ==
Kwai Hing is in Primary One Admission (POA) School Net 65, which includes multiple aided schools (schools operated independently of the government but funded with government money); none of the schools in the net are government schools.

== Transportation ==
- MTR: Kwai Hing station
