= Hing Fong (constituency) =

Hong Kong constituency

- Elected constituency for the Kwai Tsing District Council
- Boundary of Hing Fong in Kwai Tsing District
- District: Kwai Tsing
- Legislative Council constituency: New Territories South West
- Population: 14,860 (2019)
- Electorate: 7,257 (2019)

Current constituency
- Created: 1999
- Number of members: One
- Member: vacant
- Created from: Kwai Hing, Kwai Fong, Kwai Wah

Hing Fong is one of the 31 constituencies of the Kwai Tsing District Council. The seat elects one member of the council every four years. It was first created in the 1999 elections. Its boundary is loosely based on the areas surrounding the Kwai Fong station.

== Councillors represented ==
Election	Member	Party
1999	Ng Kim-sing	Democratic
2019	Tong Ho-man→vacant	Democratic

== Election results ==
=== 2010s ===
Kwai Tsing District Council Election, 2019: Hing Fong
Party	Candidate	Votes	%	±%
Democratic	Tong Ho-man	3,101	58.47	+7.79
DAB	Tang Lai-ling	2,177	41.04	−8.28
Nonpartisan	Wong Hon-chi	26	0.49	
Majority		924	17.43	
Turnout		5,231	73.34	
Democratic hold		Swing		

Kwai Tsing District Council Election, 2015: Hing Fong
Party	Candidate	Votes	%	±%
Democratic	Ng Kim-sing	2,701	50.68	−0.72
DAB	Leung Kar-ming	2,629	49.32	+0.72
Majority		72	1.36	
Turnout		5,330	51.23	
Democratic hold		Swing	−0.72	

Kwai Tsing District Council Election, 2011: Hing Fong
Party	Candidate	Votes	%	±%
Democratic	Ng Kim-sing	2,143	51.40	−1.03
DAB	Leung Kar-ming	2,026	48.60	+4.27
Majority		117	2.80	
Turnout		4,169	48.16	
Democratic hold		Swing	−2.65	

=== 2000s ===
Kwai Tsing District Council Election, 2007: Hing Fong
Party	Candidate	Votes	%	±%
Democratic	Ng Kim-sing	1,716	52.43	−7.23
DAB	Leung Kar-ming	1,451	44.33	+3.99
Independent	Luk King-shing	106	3.24	N/A
Majority		265	8.10	
Democratic hold		Swing	−5.61	

Kwai Tsing District Council Election, 2003: Hing Fong
Party	Candidate	Votes	%	±%
Democratic	Ng Kim-sing	1,350	59.66	+5.12
DAB	Peter Cheung	913	40.34	−5.12
Majority		437	19.32	
Democratic hold		Swing	+5.12	

=== 1990s ===
Kwai Tsing District Council Election, 1999: Hing Fong
Party	Candidate	Votes	%	±%
Democratic	Ng Kim-sing	762	54.58	
DAB	Peter Cheung	634	45.42	
Majority		128	9.16	
Democratic win (new seat)				
