= 2015 incidents of lead in drinking water in Hong Kong =

Water safety incidents

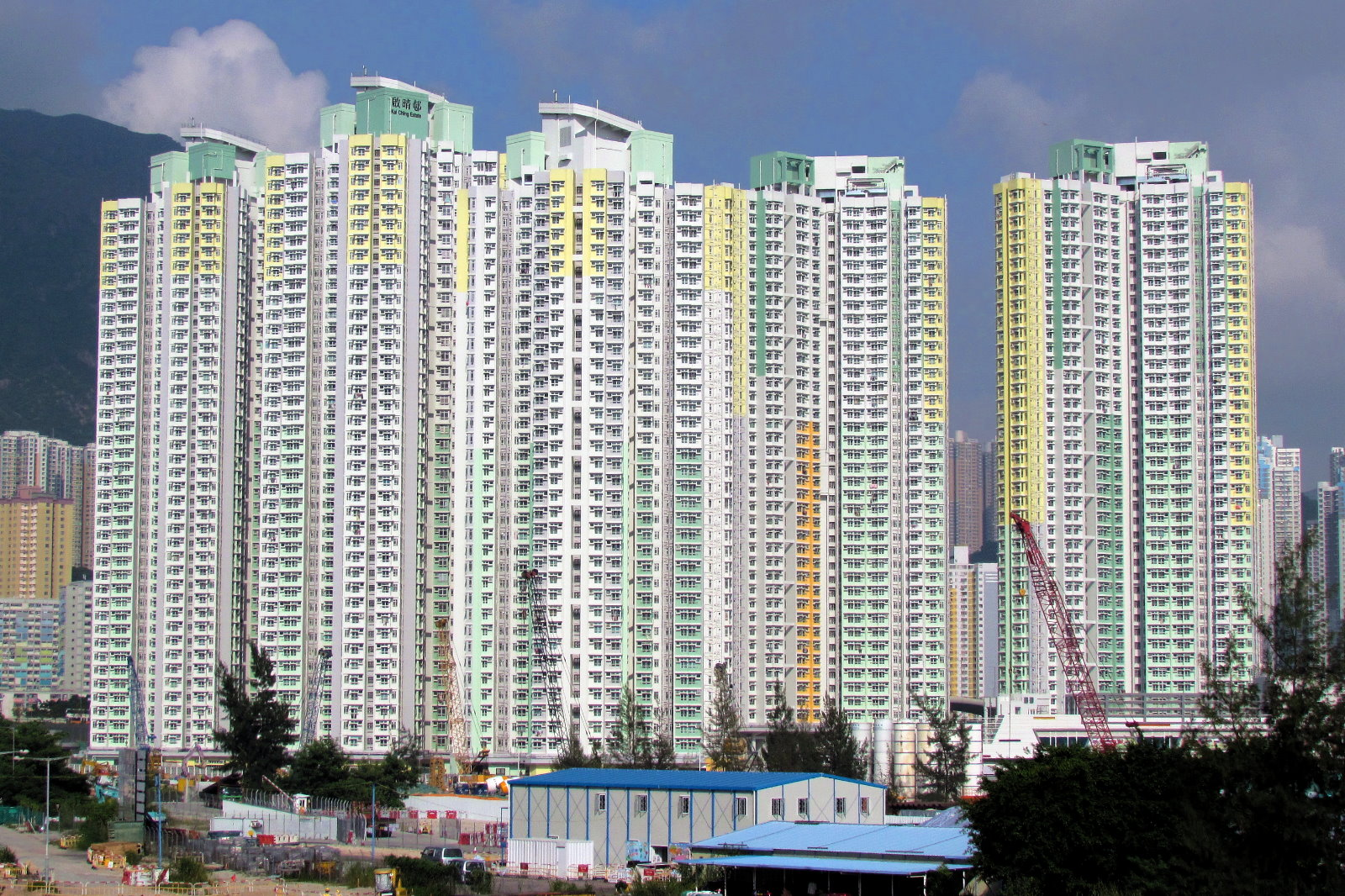
Kai Ching Estate, where lead contamination of drinking water was first uncovered

Samples of potable water in Hong Kong were found to contain excessive levels of heavy metals including lead, nickel and cadmium in 2015. Such discoveries of contamination caused widespread crisis within the city.

The scandal began in June 2015 when the Democratic Party announced that testing of drinking water at Kai Ching Estate in Kowloon revealed lead contamination. The Hong Kong Housing Authority subsequently confirmed that the levels of lead exceeded the standard established by the World Health Organization. Since the initial discovery at Kai Tak, lead contamination of drinking water has been found at numerous other housing estates, schools, and public buildings across Hong Kong.

== Heavy metal content in domestically used water ==
Potable water that is used in Hong Kong indicated high levels of heavy metal when it was tested. The heavy metals include lead, nickel and cadmium. The discovery was made in 2015 when the Democratic Party undertook the responsibility of testing the water that was used at Kai Ching Estate. Hong Kong Housing Authority also discovered the presence of heavy metal in the water that was used was higher in comparison to the World Health Organization standards. Since lead water pipes have been used in the past there are certain acceptable limits of lead occurrence in drinking water where Hong Kong standard limit is at 10 micrograms of lead per litre. Helena Wong who is a member of the Democratic Party led to the exposure of the presence of high levels beyond the set standard of lead occurrence in domestic used water in an estate in Kowloon City. The source that resulted to high level of lead in the water was the illegal welding at the joints of the water pipes. After the discovery was made the government tried to shift the blame to the contractor but the contractor rejected the blame. The contractor claimed that his organisation was responsible for the installation of outside pipes thus didn't undertake the mandate to install the pipes inside the building.

== Lead standards ==
Lead is a toxin that can cause serious and irreversible health damage. Children are especially vulnerable to its effects. Due to the historic usage of lead water pipes, many jurisdictions have legal limits on safety levels of lead content in drinking water. Hong Kong standards limit the acceptable lead content of drinking water to 10 micrograms of lead per litre, the same standard as Europe, Australia, Taiwan, Japan and Singapore. For comparison, the United States allows 15 micrograms while Mainland China allows 10 micrograms per litre.

== Discovery and cause ==
On 5 July 2015, Democratic Party legislator Helena Wong exposed the lead contamination in tap water at Kai Ching Estate, a newly constructed public housing estate in Kowloon City. Samples had been sent for testing at one of the six laboratories authorised by the government. According to the Water Supplies Department, the public monopoly supplier of potable water, the contamination was caused by illegal soldering at the joints of water pipes. Government officials attempted to pass the blame onto a building contractor. The contractor in turn rejected the accusation, saying that he had installed outside piping and had no role in installing pipes inside the building to each apartment. He asserted that materials used by his firm were approved by the housing authorities, and suggested the government may have not diligently checked the presence of prefabricated materials used in constructing other parts of the public housing projects. On 13 July 2015, after being identified by the WSD as being accountable for pipe work of Kai Ching Estate, licensed plumber Lam Tak-sum refuted HA's accusation, saying he was only responsible for the pipes connecting the water mains to water tanks of blocks, and that his scope excluded pipe work inside the flats and testing of water quality. However, Leung Chung-lap, assistant director of WSD, rebutted Lam's claim and said records showed that LP was also responsible for the pipelines into flats.

Public disquiet further intensified after the press and public discovered throughout the following months of more and more instances of lead contamination, including in schools and on other premises. Of the 11 public rental housing estates with lead in water identified as of 10 September 2015, six were built by Yau Lee Construction Company, two by China State Construction Engineering (Hong Kong) Limited, two by Paul Y Engineering, and one by Shui on Group. However, the plumbing in public estates may be built by a subcontractor. In the case of Kai Ching Estate where the scandal began, the plumbing contractor was the Ho Biu Kei Construction & Engineering Company. The head of Ho Biu Kei responded that the construction materials he used were approved by the authorities, and that his company was only responsible for the plumbing on the outside of the building, not the plumbing in the flats. The interior plumbing comprises prefabricated components manufactured by Shenzhen Hailong Construction Products Co., Ltd., a subsidiary of China State Construction Engineering.

On 25 September 2015, the Task Force on Excessive Lead in Drinking Water set up by the government released a preliminary finding that solder joints were the cause of the lead contamination, as previously asserted by the Water Supplies Department. The task force also found that copper alloy fittings leach lead, but not to an excessive degree. Elemental analysis of solder from Kai Ching Estate found it comprises up to 41 per cent lead, or 585 times the British Standard of 0.07 per cent. Helena Wong revealed in early November that Chief Secretary Carrie Lam and a Health Department official had separately asked Wong in July, shortly after she made her revelations, for the name of the laboratory that conducted the tests. Wong herself refused to identify the laboratory she mandated, and added that laboratories had received queries from the government, leading to fears that the government was attempting end the affair by putting pressure on laboratories not to perform any further tests.

== Contaminated buildings ==
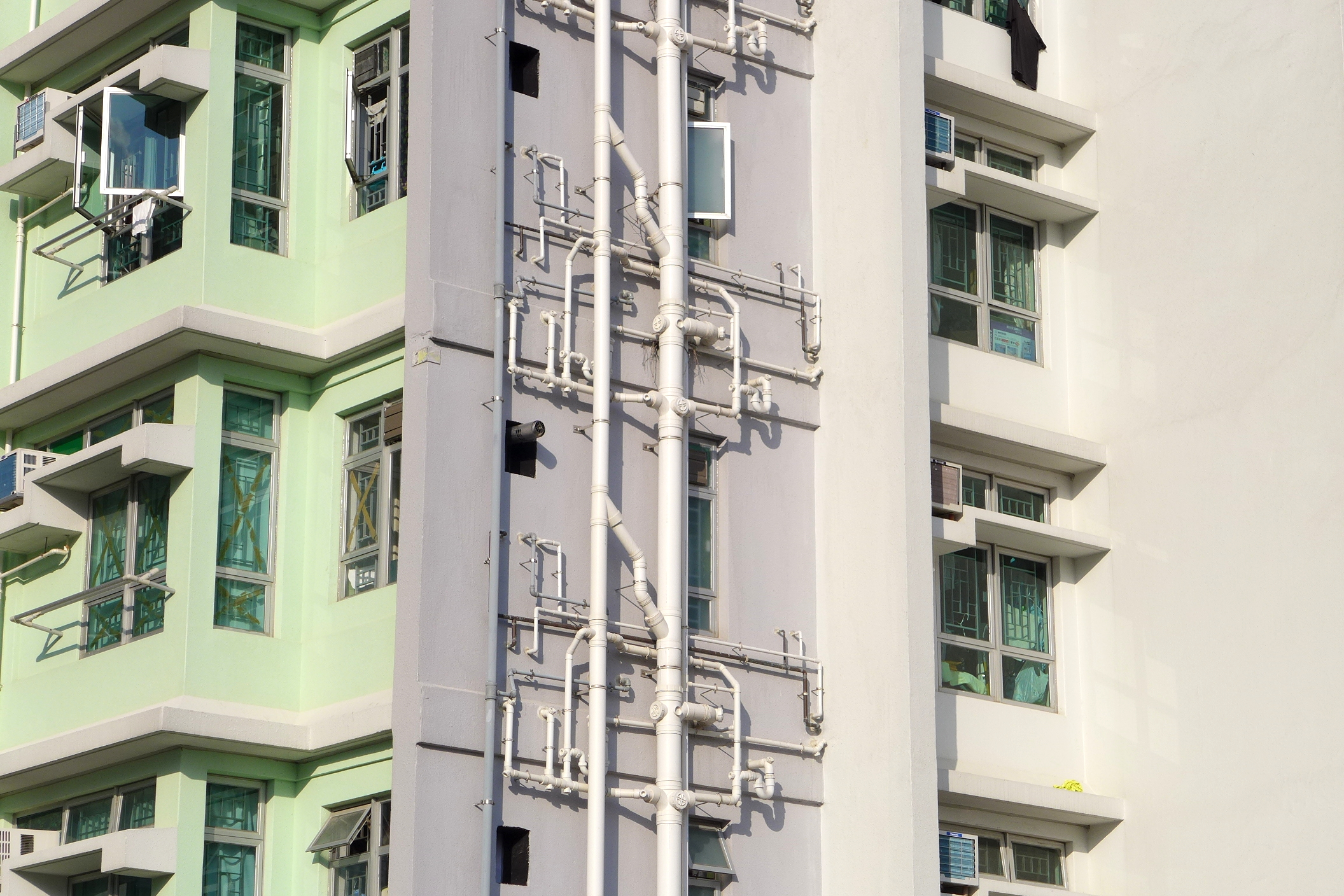
Kai Ching Estate water plumbing

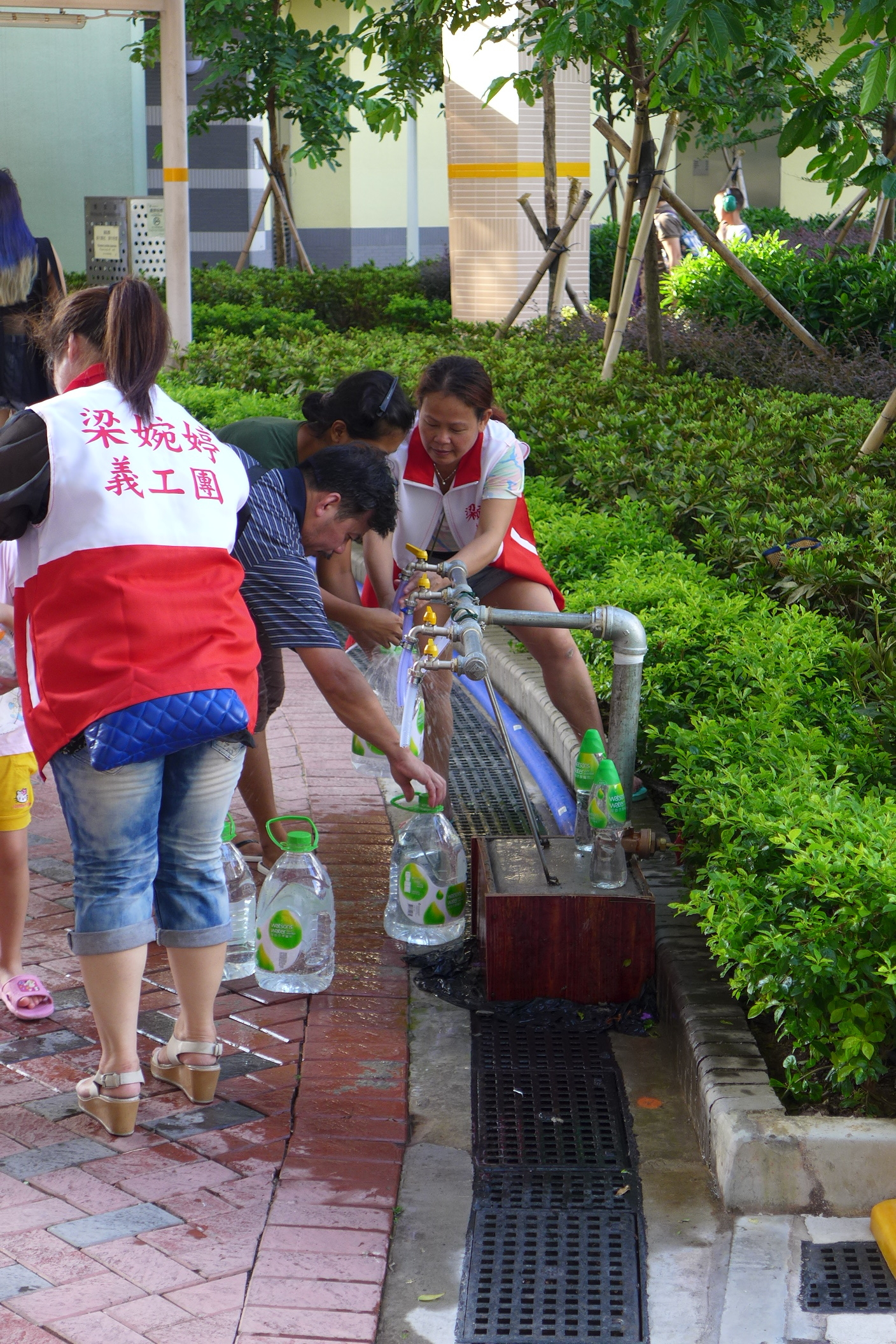
Kai Ching Estate temporary water supply

Samples of water contaminated with lead have been identified at a range of public and private buildings of various ages, but especially in public housing estates constructed in the past decade. Individual buildings and institutions have commissioned water testing at their premises across the city. The government is conducting testing at many schools and public estates.

=== Housing ===
Lead has been found in the water of numerous public housing estates, particularly those opened in the past decade. In addition to Kai Ching Estate, these include Kwai Luen Estate (Kwai Chung), Hung Hom Estate, Tung Wui Estate (Wong Tai Sin), Choi Fook Estate (Choi Wan), Un Chau Estate (Sham Shui Po), Ching Ho Estate (Sheung Shui), Lower Ngau Tau Kok Estate, and four other as of 10 September 2015. As of the same date, 64 other public housing developments were tested but no excessive lead contamination found. This does not necessarily clear these estates of the possibility of contamination, as the number of tests completed to date varies in each location and the testing has not been exhaustive of each housing block or drinking water tap.

Lead contamination has also affected private residential developments. Property management company Savills Guardian conducted testing at The Caldecott, a luxury estate in Kowloon Tong built in 2004, and found 19 micrograms of lead per litre of water sourced from a kitchen tap. A water sample from The Austin, a newly built luxury development atop Austin station, was found to contain 41 micrograms of lead per litre.

=== Schools ===
Lead contamination was discovered at numerous schools. SKH St. Thomas' Primary School in Sham Shui Po, the first case, where test results on potable water were 330% above WHO guidelines was disclosed by Apple Daily on 23 August. Another Kowloon school, St. Francis of Assisi's Caritas School (SFACS) in Shek Kip Mei, reported contamination above WHO standards in three out of five samples taken from its premises. One sample was found to contain 220 mg of lead per litre of water; two other samples, from the kitchen and canteen, were found to have 25 mg and 26 mg of lead per litre, respectively. This spurred the Hong Kong Professional Teachers' Union to urge the government to test water in all of Hong Kong schools, and give financial assistance and issue guidelines to schools opting to have their own water supply tested. However, Secretary for Education Eddie Ng refused, saying that as many schools had since installed water filters for their drinking fountains and faucets, and that students themselves had started bringing their own drinking water supplies, the government would prioritise water standards at public housing estates.

The Baptist Rainbow Primary School in Wong Tai Sin announced the discovery of water contamination on 31 August 2015. It marked the first time that lead contamination had been found in an older building. The school was built in 1984.

The English Schools Foundation collected more than 300 water samples for testing from its 21 schools across Hong Kong. It announced in September 2015 that samples from four schools (King George V School, Sha Tin College, South Island School, and West Island School) contained elevated levels of lead. The ESF subsequently shut off the sources of contaminated water.

== Reaction ==
The lead contamination of water has resulted in a public outcry and intense media scrutiny.

=== Palliative measures ===
From 10 July, the government commenced supplying free bottled water to households in all affected estates, numbering 30,000 in total. It was subsequently revealed that some 6.5 million bottles of AS Watson water were supplied to affected residents up to end of October, at an estimated cost to the taxpayer of HK$40 million.

In early November, Chief Secretary Carrie Lam announced that households affected by a tainted water would receive rebates of up to HK$660 (US$85) on their water bills. The four main water pipe contractors for the affected estates agreed to install temporary pipes and undertake permanent replacement at a total cost of HK$140 million as a gesture of goodwill. They also agreed to pay HK$20 million in compensation to affected tenants without any admission of responsibility.

=== Political reaction ===
Pre-empting the government confirmation of high concentration of lead at Kai Ching Estate, Chiang Lai-wan pro-establishment legislator from the DAB claimed that the Democratic Party's test results were scaremongering. Later, the media reported that her husband, Raymond Leung Hai-ming, was an independent non-executive director of China State Construction, the contractor of Kai Ching Estate. Chiang's speech led to a doubt on the involvement of conflict of interests in her position.

Members of the Legislative Council of Hong Kong urged the government to thoroughly investigate the scandal. On 16 July 2015, Neo Democrats legislator Gary Fan Kwok-wai and Labour Party legislator Cyd Ho Sau-lan invoked Legislative Council (Powers and Privileges) Ordinance (PNP) to investigate the crisis. The motion was passed in geographical constituency by a margin of 3 votes but failed in the split voting arrangement with Functional Constituencies dominated by pro-establishment legislators. On 22 July 2015, the Democratic Party legislator Wu Chi-wai tabled the same motion on the LegCo panel on housing, but this was again rejected by the pro-establishment lawmakers by a margin of 11:8.

On 13 August, the government appointed a Commission of Inquiry into Excess Lead Found in Drinking Water chaired by Mr Justice Andrew Chan, with Alan Lai as Commissioner.

On 20 August, the Housing Authority's tender committee announced that it would delay the tendering process for construction of four new public housing estates. Some of the contractors bidding on these developments were blamed for causing lead contamination of water in previous estates they had built.

As Secretary for Education Eddie Ng initially refused to test the water supply in all kindergartens or install water filters to help protect the health and welfare of highly vulnerable children, uproar only abated when Chief Secretary Carrie Lam announced on 3 September that tests would be conducted on supplies to kindergartens across the territory to ensure the safe potable water for the most vulnerable schoolchildren. The government's handling of the crisis caused CY Leung's support rate to hit a new low since he came to power in 2012. Results of a survey released in early September showed Leung was disapproved of across all demographics. Approvals amounted to 22 percent and disapprovals were at 62 percent – a net popularity of negative 39 percentage points; similarly, the satisfaction rate for the HK government stood at 21 percent while its dissatisfaction rate was at 50 percent – a net of negative 29 points.

In September 2015, the Independent Commission Against Corruption (ICAC) opened an investigation into whether corruption or abuse of power contributed to the lead contamination incident. The case was submitted to the ICAC by the Association for Democracy and People's Livelihood and People Power in July.

In May 2016, after a one year long investigation, an inquiry commission formed by the government concluded that the incident has been a "collective" failure of numerous government departments. No specific person or department has been found guilty. On 11 July 2016, a meeting was held for LegCo House Committee to discuss "Report of the Commission of Inquiry into Excess Lead Found in Drinking Water" released by the government previously. Lawmakers condemned that, in light of the scandal, no government officials had stepped down under the current Principal Officials Accountability System, and Chief Secretary for Administration Carrie Lam even did not offer an apology. They criticised that the accountability system existed in name only.

=== Sanctions for contractors ===
Four main contractors were barred from tendering seven new projects involving construction of 18,000 flats under HA from March to September 2015. In August 2015, main contractors installed water filters for affected households and do the replacement or cleaning of water filters regularly. On 6 November 2015, the Tender Committee from the Housing Authority Committees suspended them from submitting tenders to one year.

In November 2015, main contractors announced that they would pledge $20 million for paying the water bills of 29,000 affected households for about a year. Contractors were required to change all the pipes inside the affected households. The non-compliant water pipes in common areas of 11 affected public estates have been progressively replaced since March 2016, starting with Kwai Yuet House at Lower Ngau Tau Kok Estate on 17 October 2016.

== See also ==
- Lead paint
- Metalworking
- Metal fume fever
