= Kai Ching Estate =

Public housing estate in Kai Tak, Hong Kong

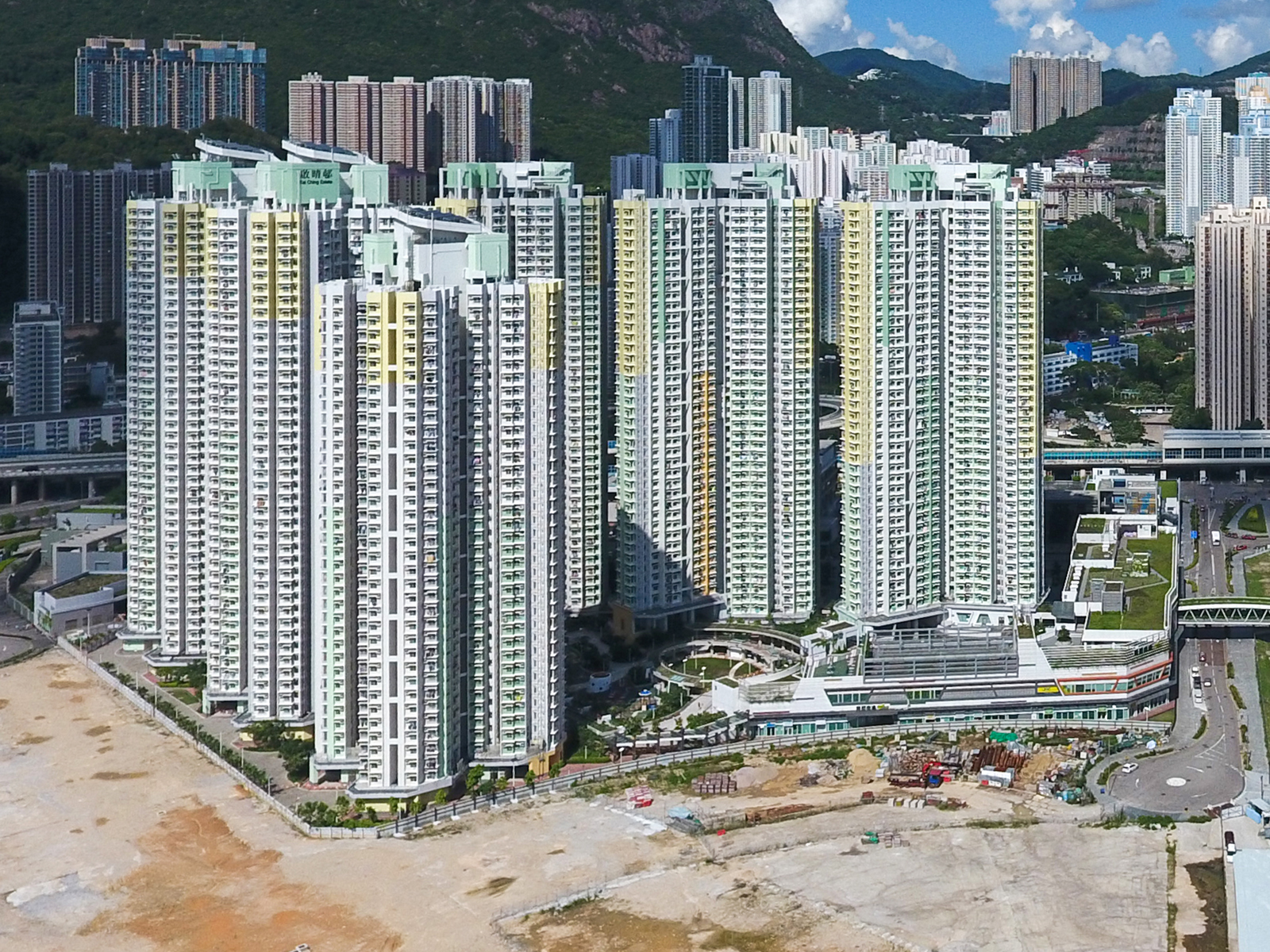
- Kai Ching Estate
- Interactive map of Kai Ching Estate

General information
- Location: 12 Muk Hung Street, Kai Tak; Kowloon, Hong Kong
- Status: Completed
- Category: Public rental housing
- Population: 11,881
- No. of blocks: 6
- No. of units: 5,204

Construction
- Constructed: 2013; 13 years ago

Other information
- Governing body: Hong Kong Housing Authority

Kai Ching Estate
- Traditional Chinese: 啟晴邨
- Simplified Chinese: 启晴邨
- Cantonese Yale: kái chìhng chyūn
Transcriptions
Standard Mandarin
- Hanyu Pinyin: Qǐqíngcūn
Yue: Cantonese
- Yale Romanization: kái chìhng chyūn
- Jyutping: kai2 cing4 cyun1

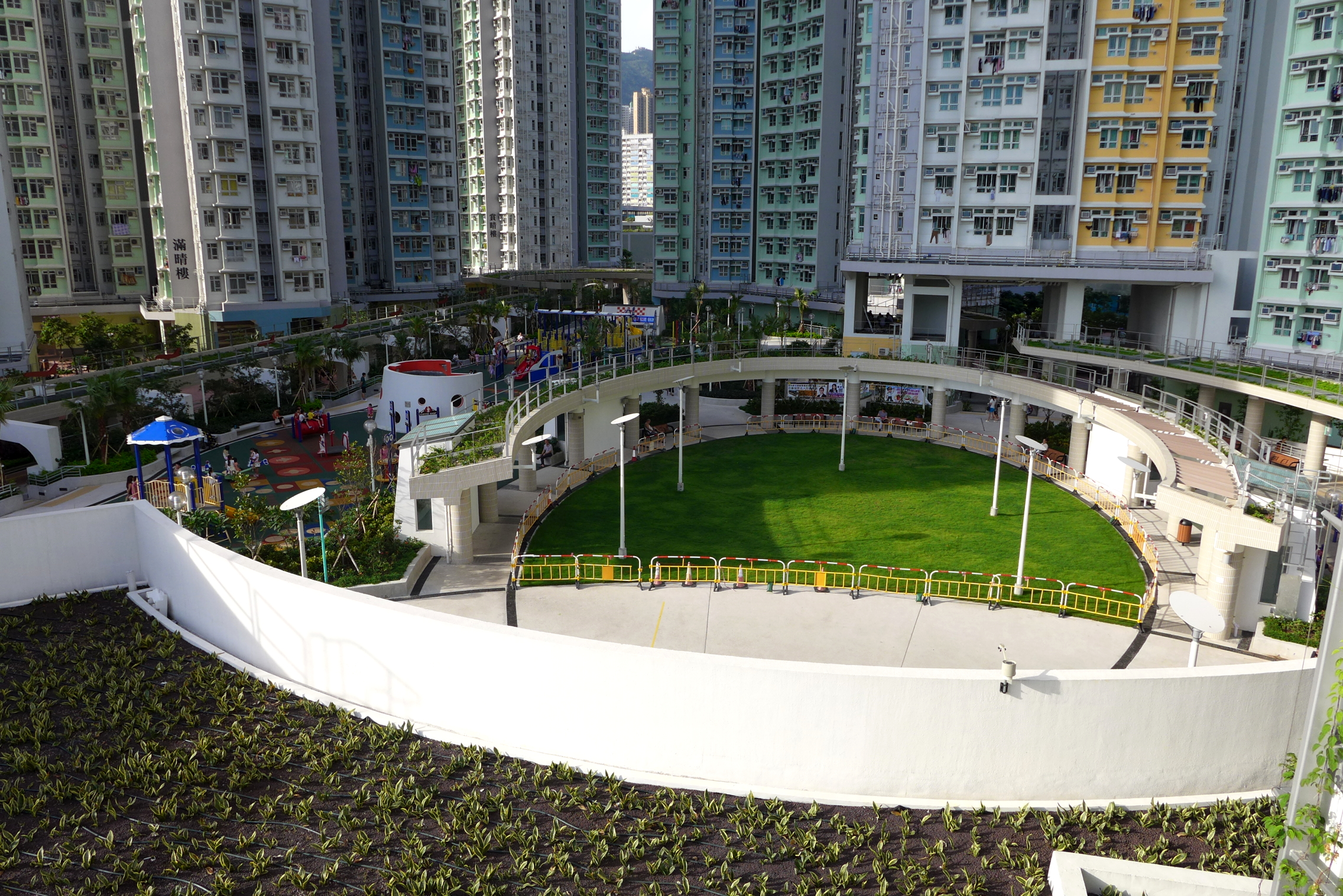
Open space inside estate

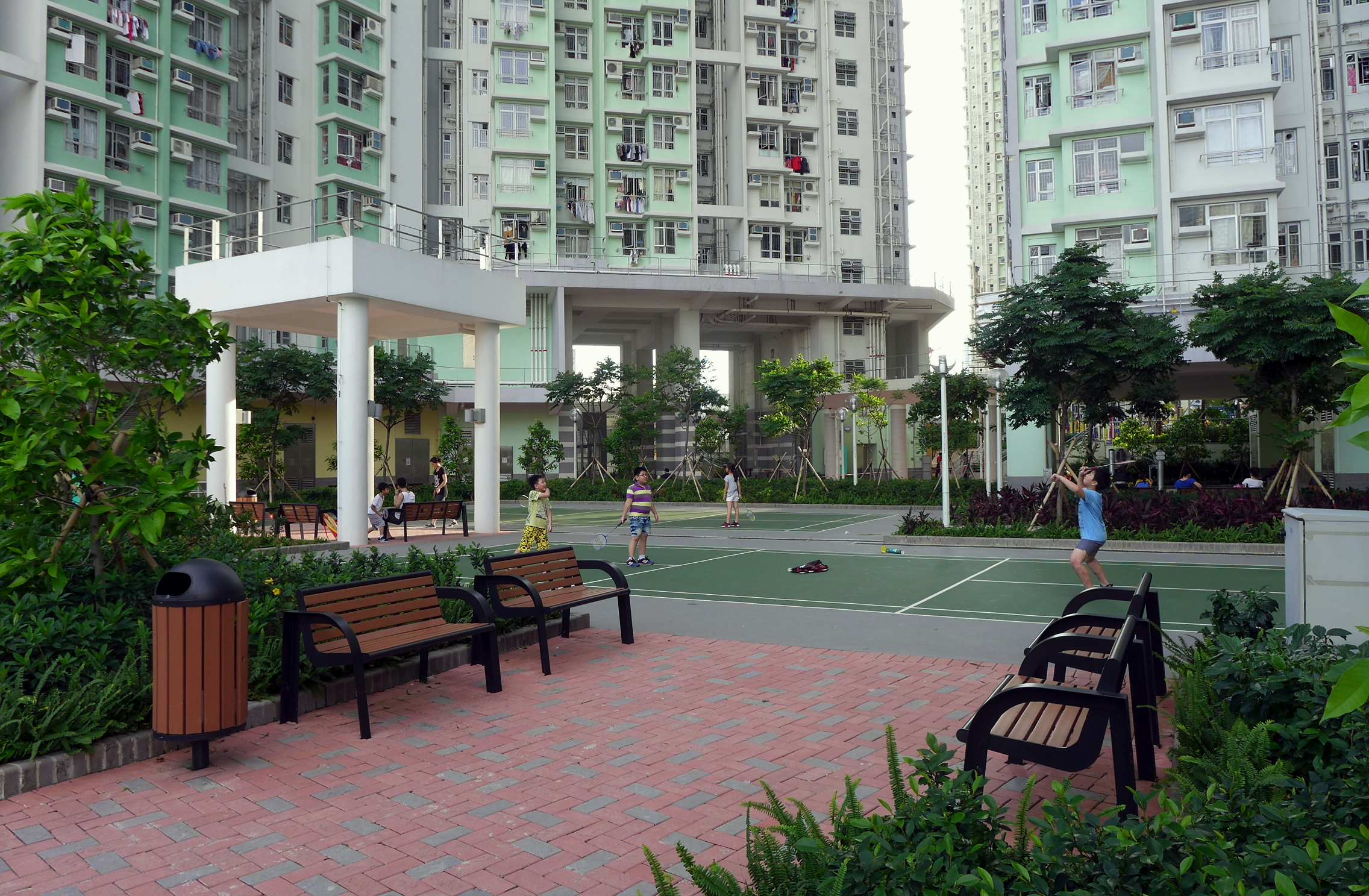
Badminton Court

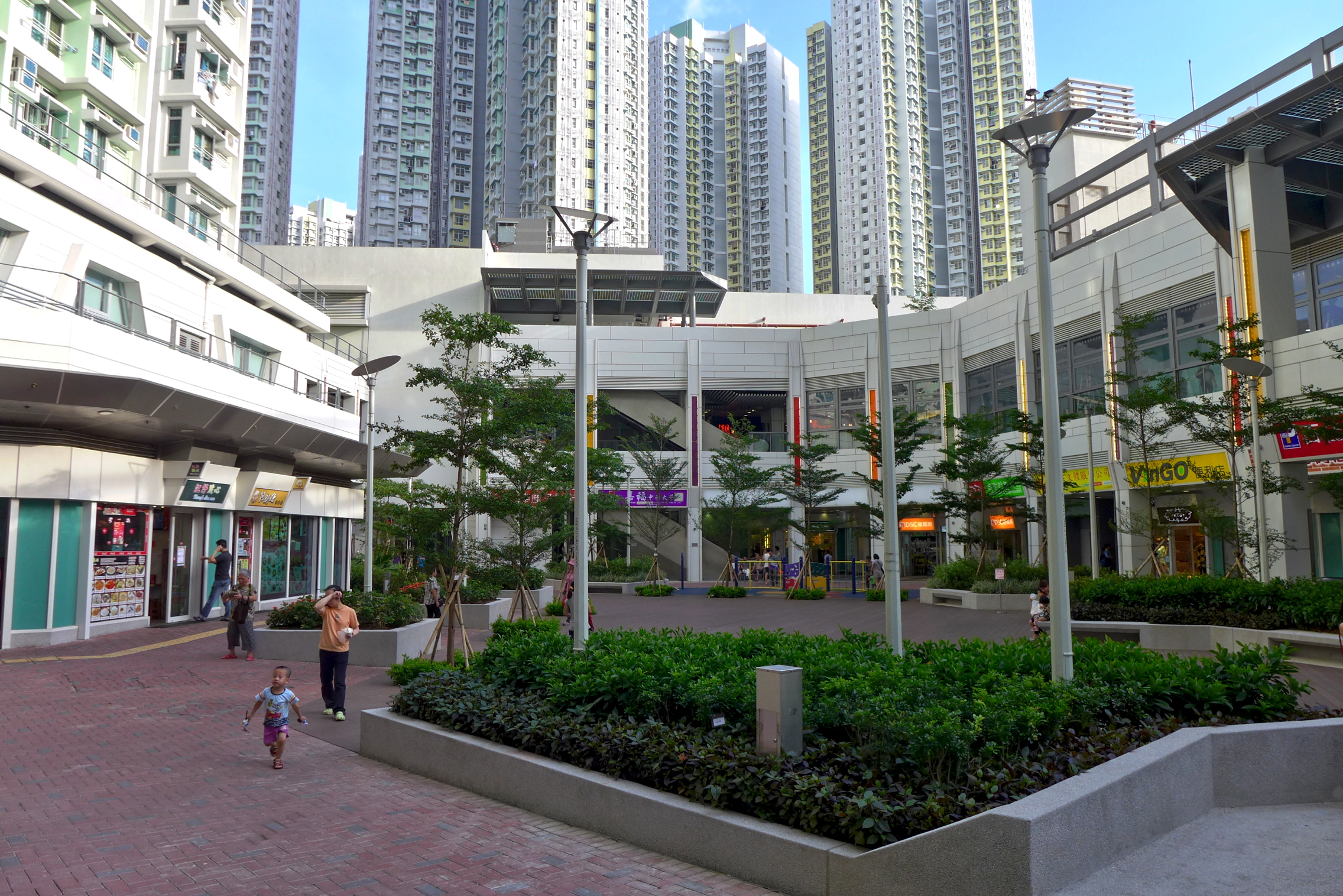
Ching Long Shopping Centre

Kai Ching Estate is a public housing estate in a brownfield development area of the disused Kai Tak Airport in Hong Kong. It consists of six residential buildings completed in 2013. It houses around 5,200 flats for 13,300 residents and shares the "Ching Long Shopping Centre" with Tak Long Estate. Kai Ching Estate was built by China State Construction Engineering (Hong Kong).

== History ==
In 1998, the Kai Tak Airport relocated to Chek Lap Kok as Hong Kong International Airport, clearing the way for a redevelopment of the Kai Tak lands. In 2006, the Planning Department outlined plans to build two new public estates on part of this brownfield site. The two estates, called Kai Ching (啟晴) and Tak Long (德朗), opened on the former north apron in 2013 and 2014 respectively. Like other public housing estates in Hong Kong, the construction of Kai Ching Estate made use of prefabricated components including precast facades and staircases, semi-precast slabs, and precast kitchens and bathrooms. Kai Ching was also a pilot estate for the use of precast water taps.

The estate incorporates several energy and water saving features. Renewable energy sources include solar panels on the housing block rooftops, and lift motors that can generate power when the lift is carrying a heavy load down, a light load up, or under braking conditions. A district cooling system cools non-domestic facilities including the shops, kindergartens, and estate offices. A rainwater collection system is used for irrigation.

== Houses ==
Name		Type	Storeys	Completion
Hong Ching House	康晴樓	Non-standard block (Y-shaped)	39	2013
Lok Ching House	樂晴樓	Non-standard block (Y-shaped)	40	2013
Yan Ching House	欣晴樓	Non-standard block (Y-shaped)	40	2013
Sheung Ching House	賞晴樓	Non-standard block (cross-shaped)	40	2013
Mun Ching House	滿晴樓	Non-standard block (cross-shaped)	40	2013
Yuet Ching House	悅晴樓	Non-standard block (cross-shaped)	35	2013

== Demographics ==
According to the 2016 by-census, Kai Ching Estate had a population of 11,881. The median age was 44.3 and the majority of residents (98.5 per cent) were of Chinese ethnicity. The average household comprised 2.3 persons. The median monthly household income of all households (i.e. including both economically active and inactive households) was HK$14,010.

== Education ==
Kai Ching Estate is in Primary One Admission (POA) School Net 34. Within the school net are multiple aided schools (operated independently but funded with government money) and two government schools: Farm Road Government Primary School and Ma Tau Chung Government Primary School.

== Incidents ==
=== 2014 shooting ===
The estate dominated television news for some days in early June 2014 after resident Li Tak-yan shot and killed Liu Kai-chung, another resident of Lok Ching House. The murder sparked a 12-hour standoff with police as Li hid in his flat on the 10th storey. Amid exchanges of gunfire, police fired tear gas and stun grenades into the flat. The gunman shot and killed himself. Li, a mainland Chinese immigrant and father of actress Liddy Li, had previously been jailed for attacking a neighbour with a chopper and hammer. Media reported that Li had other guns and ammunition at home.

=== 2015 Contamination of drinking water ===
In 2015, water samples from Kai Ching Estate were found to be contaminated with lead, sparking a citywide scandal and the discovery of contaminated drinking water at many other buildings. Pipe soldering samples taken from Kai Ching Estate contained 50 per cent lead.

=== 2015 Legionellosis case ===
The government announced on 13 July 2015 that a man suffering from a chronic illness had been admitted to intensive care on 28 May. The water supply at the home of the 72-year-old resident of Mun Ching House had tested positive for Legionella bacteria. The news created fear and uncertainty among residents, who complained that authorities delayed the announcement despite learning of the case in May. The government's lack of transparency was criticised by pro-establishment and pro-democracy politicians alike.
