= Kwai Hing (constituency) =

Hong Kong constituency

- Elected constituency for the Kwai Tsing District Council
- Boundary of Kwai Hing in Kwai Tsing District
- District: Kwai Tsing
- Legislative Council constituency: New Territories South West
- Population: 13,197 (2019)
- Electorate: 7,395 (2019)

Current constituency
- Created: 1994
- Number of members: One
- Member: Leung Chi-shing (NWSC)

Kwai Hing (Chinese: 葵興) is one of the 31 constituencies of the Kwai Tsing District, returning one member to the Kwai Tsing District Council every four years. It was first created in 1994.

Loosely based on Kwai Hing Estate, the constituency has an estimated population of 13,197 as of 2019.

== Councillors represented ==
| Election | Member | Party |
|---|---|---|
| 1994 | Leung Chi-shing | CTU |
| 199? | Leung Chi-shing | NWSC |

== Election results ==
=== 2010s ===
Kwai Tsing District Council Election, 2019: Kwai Hing
| Party | Candidate | Votes | % | ±% |
|---|---|---|---|---|
| NWSC | Leung Chi-shing | 3,532 | 71.50 | −0.51 |
| FTU | Lee Wai-lok | 1,408 | 28.50 | +0.51 |
| Majority | | 2,124 | 43.00 | |
| Turnout | | 4,969 | 67.21 | |
| NWSC hold | | Swing | | |

Kwai Tsing District Council Election, 2015: Kwai Hing
| Party | Candidate | Votes | % | ±% |
|---|---|---|---|---|
| NWSC | Leung Chi-shing | 2,931 | 72.01 | +14.86 |
| FTU | Leung Chi-ho | 1,139 | 27.99 | −14.74 |
| Majority | | 1,792 | 44.02 | |
| Turnout | | 4,070 | 42.02 | |
| NWSC hold | | Swing | | |

Kwai Tsing District Council Election, 2011: Kwai Hing
| Party | Candidate | Votes | % | ±% |
|---|---|---|---|---|
| NWSC | Leung Chi-shing | 2,606 | 57.27 | +1.74 |
| FTU | Chan Chi-hang | 1,944 | 42.73 | |
| Majority | | 662 | 14.54 | |
| Turnout | | 4,550 | 41.43 | |
| NWSC hold | | Swing | | |

=== 2000s ===
Kwai Tsing District Council Election, 2007: Kwai Hing
| Party | Candidate | Votes | % | ±% |
|---|---|---|---|---|
| NWSC | Leung Chi-shing | 2,221 | 55.53 | −19.23 |
| Independent | Wilson Li Mun-chiu | 1,011 | 25.28 | +0.04 |
| Independent | Betty Hui Moon-tong | 768 | 19.20 | |
| Majority | | 1,210 | 30.25 | |
| NWSC hold | | Swing | | |

Kwai Tsing District Council Election, 2003: Kwai Hing
| Party | Candidate | Votes | % | ±% |
|---|---|---|---|---|
| NWSC | Leung Chi-shing | 2,627 | 74.76 | |
| DAB | Wilson Li Mun-chiu | 887 | 25.24 | |
| Majority | | 1,740 | 49.52 | |
| NWSC hold | | Swing | | |

=== 1990s ===
Kwai Tsing District Council Election, 1999: Kwai Hing
| Party | Candidate | Votes | % | ±% |
|---|---|---|---|---|
| NWSC | Leung Chi-shing | uncontested | | |
| NWSC hold | | Swing | | |

Kwai Tsing District Board Election, 1994: Kwai Hing
| Party | Candidate | Votes | % | ±% |
|---|---|---|---|---|
| CTU | Leung Chi-shing | 1,292 | 76.95 | |
| Pioneer | Lam Chi-leung | 387 | 23.05 | |
| Majority | | 905 | 43.90 | |
| CTU win (new seat) | | | | |
