= Cho Yiu Chuen =

Public housing estate in Kwai Chung, Hong Kong

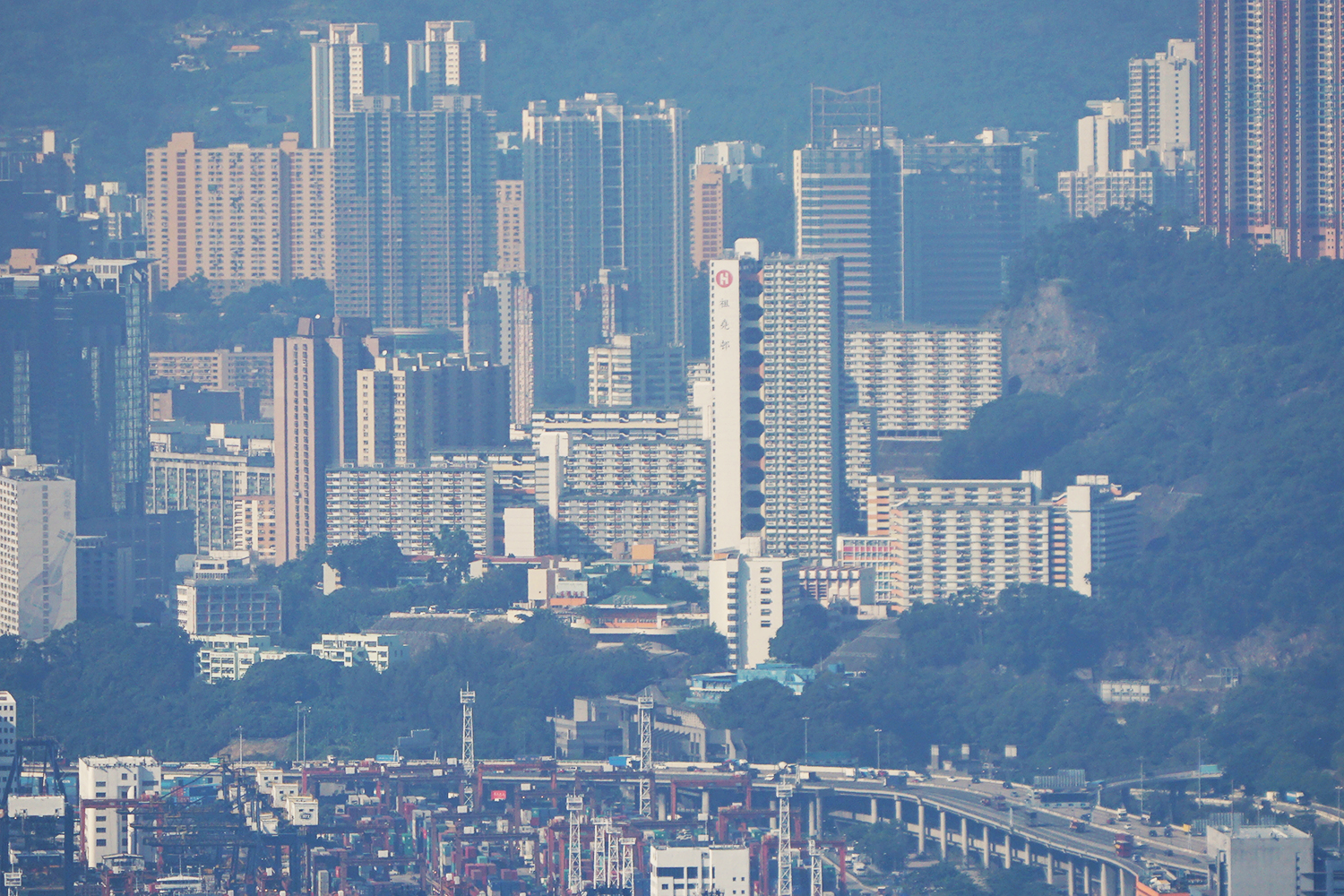
- Cho Yiu Chuen
- Interactive map of Cho Yiu Chuen

General information
- Location: 1-5 Lai Cho Road; 2-3 Lim Cho Street; 2-6 Wing Cho Street; Lai King; Kwai Chung; New Territories, Hong Kong
- Coordinates: 22.34459°N 114.129922°E
- Status: Completed
- Category: Public rental housing
- Population: 7,159 (2016)
- No. of blocks: 8
- No. of units: 2,532

Construction
- Constructed: 1976; 50 years ago
- Authority: Hong Kong Housing Society

Cho Yiu Chuen (Chinese: 祖堯邨) is a public housing estate developed by the Hong Kong Housing Society in Lai King, Kwai Chung, New Territories, Hong Kong. It is located near Highland Park, Lai King Estate, Yuet Lai Court, Lai King Sports Centre and Lai King Building of Princess Margaret Hospital.

The estate consists of eight residential blocks completed between 1976 and 1981. It also provides elderly persons flats at Chung Ling Sheh (Chinese: 松齡舍). It was named for Sir Cho Yiu Kwan (Chinese: 關祖堯爵士), one of the founders of Hong Kong Housing Society.

== Houses ==
Name	Chinese name	Completed
Kai Chun Lau	啟真樓	1976
Kai Kwong Lau	啟光樓	1976
Kai Lim Lau	啟廉樓	1978
Kai Him Lau	啟謙樓	1978–1979
Kai Hang Lau	啟恒樓	1978–1979
Kai Min Lau	啟勉樓	1978–1979
Chung Ling Sheh	松齡舍	1978–1979
Kai King Lau	啟敬樓	1981

== Demographics ==
According to the 2016 by-census, Cho Yiu Chuen had a population of 7,159. The median age was 47.6 and the majority of residents (96.5 per cent) were of Chinese ethnicity. The average household size was 2.8 people. The median monthly household income of all households (i.e. including both economically active and inactive households) was HK$25,580.

== Politics ==
Cho Yiu Chuen is located in Cho Yiu constituency of the Kwai Tsing District Council. It was formerly represented by Choi Nga-man, who was elected in the 2019 elections until July 2021.

== Distinctions ==
Cho Yiu Chuen received a Certificate of Merit at the 1981 Hong Kong Institute of Architects Annual Awards. Kai King Lau is the tallest building in Cho Yiu Chuen with 38 storeys. It was also the tallest public housing building in the world at that time.

== Education ==
Cho Yiu is in Primary One Admission (POA) School Net 65, which includes multiple aided schools (schools operated independently of the government but funded with government money); none of the schools in the net are government schools.

== See also ==
- Public housing estates in Kwai Chung
