= Lai Yiu Estate =

Public housing estate in Kwai Chung, Hong Kong

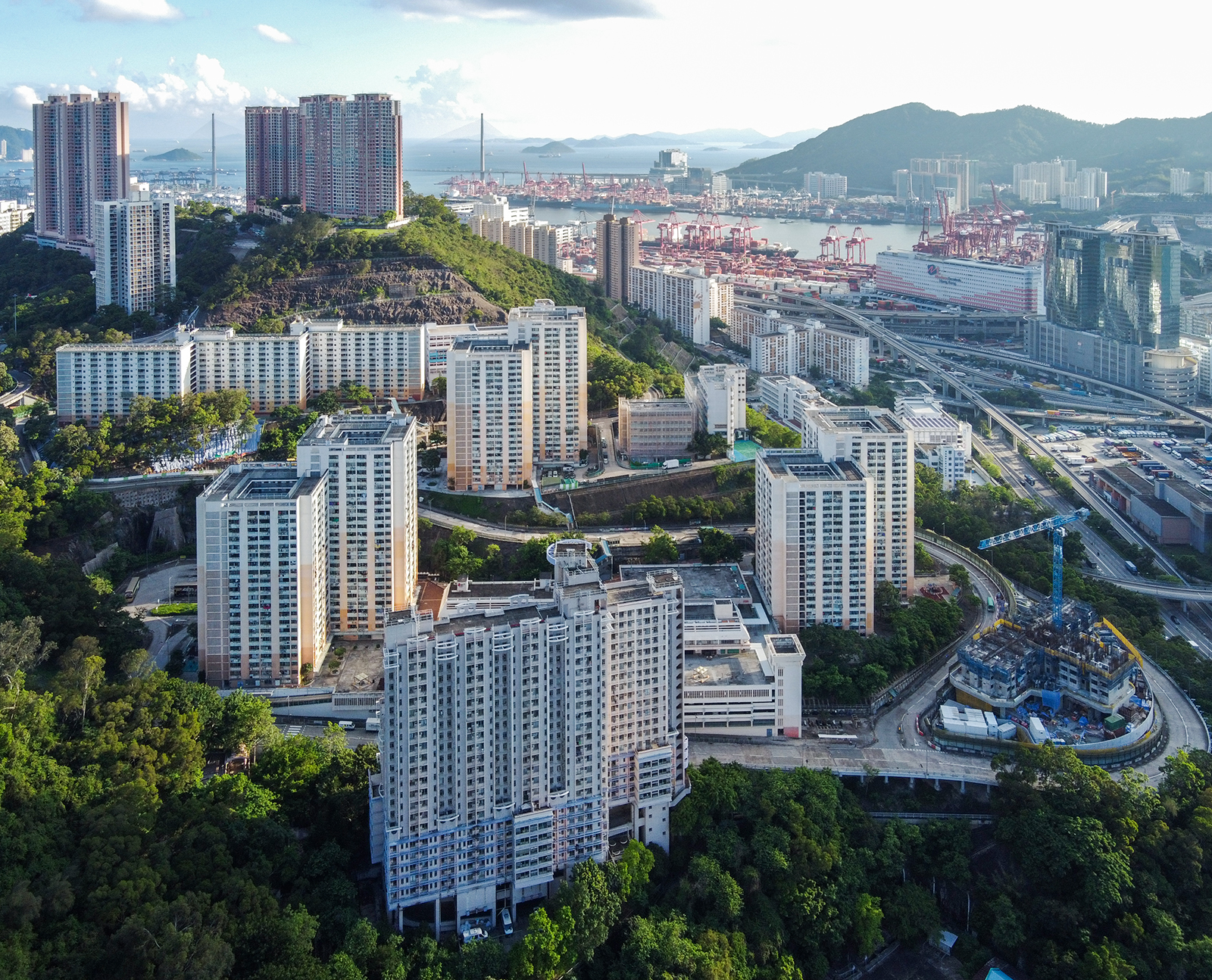
- Aerial view of Lai Yiu Estate
- Interactive map of Lai Yiu Estate

General information
- Location: 11 Lai Yiu Street, Lai King; Kwai Chung; New Territories, Hong Kong
- Coordinates: 22.354°N 114.131°E
- Status: Completed
- Category: Public rental housing
- Population: 8,254 (2016)
- No. of blocks: 5
- No. of units: 2,841

Construction
- Constructed: 1976; 50 years ago
- Authority: Hong Kong Housing Authority

Lai Yiu Estate (Chinese: 麗瑤邨) is a public housing estate in Lai King, Kwai Chung, New Territories, Hong Kong. It is located near Central Kwai Chung Park and Castle Peak Road (Kwai Chung Section). It is located at the north mid-level of Lai King Estate and it consists of five residential buildings completed in 1976, 1977 and 1999 respectively.

Tsui Yiu Court (翠瑤苑) is a Home Ownership Scheme housing court in Lai King. It is located near Lai Yiu Estate, Lai King Fire Station and Castle Peak Road (Kwai Chung Section). It has a single residential block completed in 1981.

== Houses ==
=== Lai Yiu Estate ===
| Name | Chinese name | Building type | Completed |
|---|---|---|---|
| Fu Yiu House | 富瑤樓 | Twin Tower | 1976 |
| Kwai Yiu House | 貴瑤樓 | Twin Tower | 1977 |
| Lok Yiu House | 樂瑤樓 | Twin Tower | 1977 |
| Wah Yiu House | 華瑤樓 | Old Slab | 1977 |
| Wing Yiu House | 榮瑤樓 | Small Household Block | 1999 |

=== Tsui Yiu Court ===
| Name | Chinese name | Building type | Completed |
|---|---|---|---|
| Tsui Yiu Court | 翠瑤苑 | Cross | 1981 |

== Demographics ==
In 1990, the Gross Estate Area of Lai Yiu Estate was 6.1 ha. The authorized population was 13,258 and the theoretical density was 2,173 persons/ha. The actual density was 1,437 persons/ha. As of September 2021, the authorised population of Lai Yiu Estate was 8,000.

According to the 2016 by-census, Lai Yiu Estate had a population of 8,254. The median age was 46.8 and the majority of residents (94.2 per cent) were of Chinese ethnicity. The average household size was 3 people. The median monthly household income of all households (i.e. including both economically active and inactive households) was HK$24,950.

== Politics ==
Lai Yiu Estate and Tsui Yiu Court are located in Wah Lai constituency of the Kwai Tsing District Council. It was formerly represented by Sin Chung-kai, who was elected in the 2019 elections until May 2021.

== Crime ==
In 1999, Fan Man Yee was kidnapped and later brutally tortured and raped by Chan Man-lok, Leung Wai-lun, and Leung Shing-cho. Fan would end up dying between 14 April and 15 April 1999. In 2000, The 3 men who participated in her torture would end up being sentenced to life.

== See also ==
- Public housing estates in Kwai Chung
