= Cho Yiu (constituency) =

Constituency of Kwai Tsing District Council, Hong Kong

- Elected constituency for the Kwai Tsing District Council
- Boundary of Cho Yiu in Kwai Tsing District
- District: Kwai Tsing
- Legislative Council constituency: New Territories South West
- Population: 15,760 (2019)
- Electorate: 8,634 (2019)

Current constituency
- Created: 1994
- Number of members: One
- Member: Choi Nga-man (Nonpartisan)

Cho Yiu (Chinese: 祖堯) is one of the 31 constituencies of the Kwai Tsing District Council in Hong Kong. The seat elects one member of the council every four years. It was first created in the 1994 elections. Its boundary is loosely based on part of Cho Yiu Chuen, Highland Park, Lai King Disciplined Services Quarters and Lai King Terrace in Lai King with estimated population of 15,760.

== Councillors represented ==
Election	Member	Party
1994	Lo Wai-lan	Nonpartisan
199?	Lo Wai-lan	Democratic
199?	Lo Wai-lan	Nonpartisan
2012	Lo Wai-lan	BPA
2015	Pau Ming-hong	DAB
2019	Choi Nga-man→vacant	Nonpartisan

== Election results ==
=== 2010s ===
Kwai Tsing District Council Election, 2019: Cho Yiu
Party	Candidate	Votes	%	±%
Nonpartisan	Choi Nga-man	3,297	51.48	
DAB	Pau Ming-hong	3,107	48.52	
Majority		190	2.96	
Turnout		6,427	74.46	
Nonpartisan gain from DAB		Swing		
