= 2019 Kwai Tsing District Council election =

Hong Kong local election

- 24 November 2019

31 (of the 32) seats to Kwai Tsing District Council 17 seats needed for a majority
- Turnout: 70.9% ▲22.3%
	First party	Second party	Third party
Party	Democratic	DAB	Civic
Last election	4 seats, 25.0%	8 seats, 24.7%	Did not contest
Seats before	4	8	0
Seats won	12	3	3
Seat change	▲8	▼5	▲3
Popular vote	46,503	45,309	14,449
Percentage	21.3%	20.8%	6.6%
Swing	▼3.7%	▼3.9%	N/A
	Fourth party	Fifth party	Sixth party
Party	NWSC	Roundtable	Tsing Yi People
Last election	5 seats, 13.8%	New party	New party
Seats before	2	2	0
Seats won	3	1	1
Seat change	▲1	▼2	▲1
Popular vote	12,663	6,758	4,727
Percentage	5.8%	3.1	2.2%
Swing	▼8.0%	N/A	N/A
	Seventh party	Eighth party
Party	FTU	BPA
Last election	3 seats, 8.5%	3 seats, 7.7%
Seats before	3	3
Seats won	0	0
Seat change	▼3	▼3
Popular vote	15,738	9,990
Percentage	7.2%	4.6%
Swing	▼1.3%	▼3.1%
- Colours on map indicate winning party for each constituency.

The 2019 Kwai Tsing District Council election was held on 24 November 2019 to elect all 31 elected members to the 32-member Kwai Tsing District Council.

The pro-democrats scored a landslide victory in the 2019 election and regained the control of the council by taking 27 of the 31 elected seats. Notable defeated incumbent included legislator Alice Mak of FTU in Wai Ying.

== Overall election results ==
Before election:

↓
9	20
Pro-democracy	Pro-Beijing

Change in composition:

↓
27	5
Pro-democracy	Pro-Beijing

Kwai Tsing District Council election result 2019
Party	Seats	Gains	Losses	Net gain/loss	Seats %	Votes %	Votes	+/−
Democratic	12	8	0	+8	38.7	21.3	46,503	−3.7
DAB	3	0	5	−5	9.7	20.8	45,309	−3.9
Independent	3	4	4	0	9.7	15.3	33,258	
PfD	5	1	0	+1	16.1	10.1	21,989	
FTU	0	0	3	−3	0.0	7.2	15,738	−1.3
Civic	3	3	0	+3	9.7	6.6	14,449	
NWSC	3	1	0	+1	9.7	5.8	12,663	−8.0
BPA	0	0	3	−3	0.0	4.6	9,990	−3.1
Roundtable	1	0	1	−1	3.2	3.1	6,758	
Tsing Yi People	1	1	0	+1	3.2	2.2	4,727	
Democratic Alliance	0	0	0	0	0	1.6	3,417	
Civic Passion	0	0	0	0	0	1.5	3,270	
