= Lai King Catholic Secondary School =

Secondary school in Hong Kong

Coordinates: 22.35274°N 114.12702°E

- Chinese: 荔景天主教中學
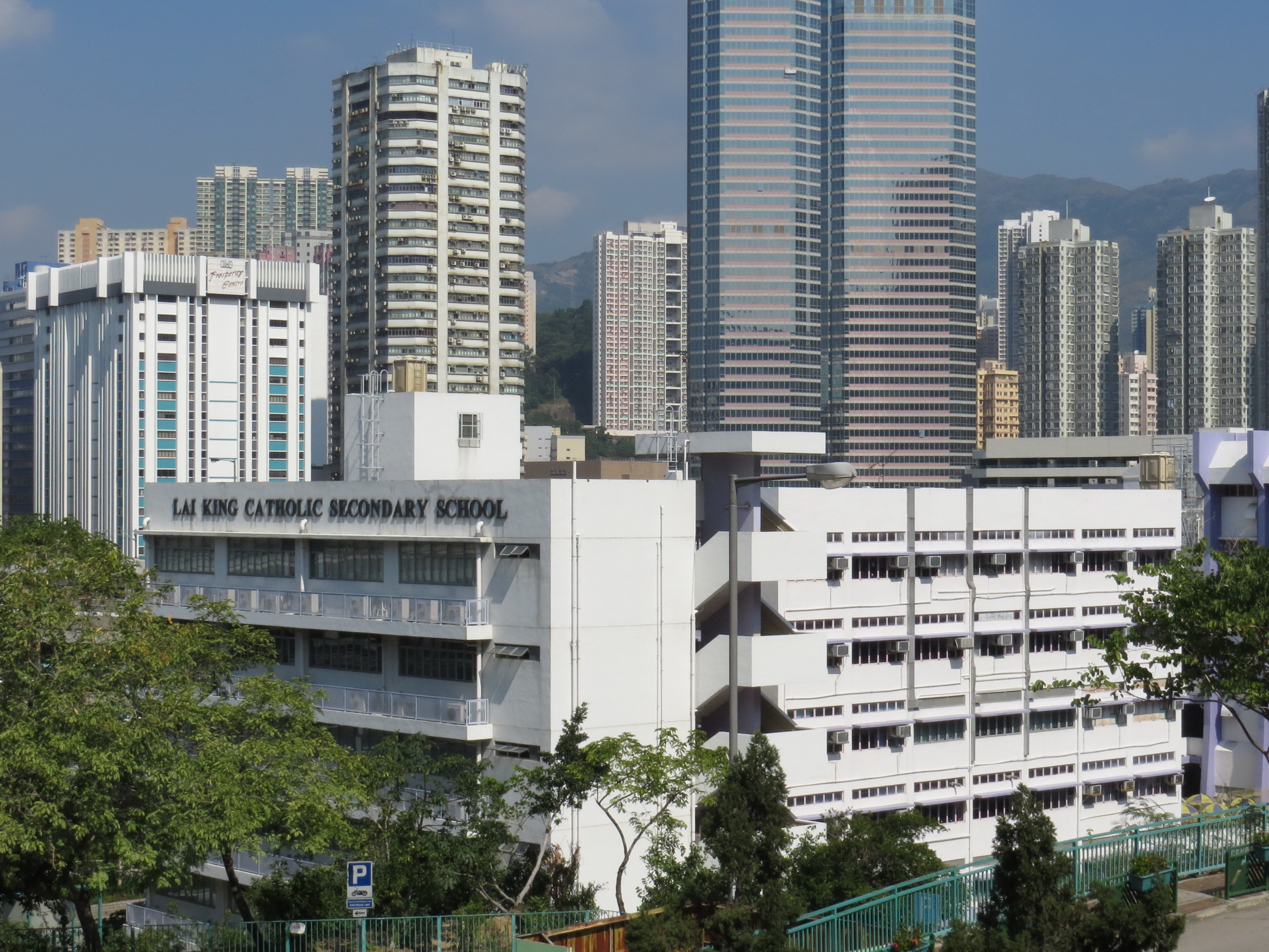

Information
- School type: Secondary school
- Religious affiliation: Catholicism
- Established: 1979; 47 years ago
- Website: www.lkcss.edu.hk

Lai King Catholic Secondary School (Chinese: 荔景天主教中學) is a Catholic secondary school in Lai King, Hong Kong. It opened in 1979 and is 'one of the few schools on the Lai King Estate. The school has over sixty staff and the principal is Mr Lau Kwong Yip.
