= Lai King (constituency) =

Hong Kong constituency

- Elected constituency for the Kwai Tsing District Council
- Boundary of Lai King in Kwai Tsing District
- District: Kwai Tsing
- Legislative Council constituency: New Territories South West
- Population: 13,858 (2019)
- Electorate: 8,405 (2019)

Current constituency
- Created: 1991
- Number of members: One
- Member: Wong Tin-yan (Independent)

Lai King (Chinese: 荔景) is one of the 31 constituencies of the Kwai Tsing District Council in Hong Kong. The seat elects one member of the council every four years. It was first created in the 1994 elections. Its boundary is loosely based on part of Lai King Estate, Yin Lai Court and Yuet Lai Court in Lai King with estimated population of 13,858.

== Councillors represented ==
Election	Member	Party
1991	Chow Yick-hay	United Democrats
1994	Chow Yick-hay	Democratic
2015	Chow Yick-hay	Nonpartisan
2019	Wong Tin-yan→vacant	Nonpartisan

== Election results ==
=== 2010s ===
Kwai Tsing District Council Election, 2019: Lai King
Party	Candidate	Votes	%	±%
Nonpartisan	Wong Tin-yan	2,836	51.51	
Nonpartisan	Chow Yick-hay	2,670	48.49	
Majority		166	3.02	
Turnout		5,521	65.70	
Nonpartisan gain from Nonpartisan		Swing		
