= Hello Kitty murder case =

1999 murder in Hong Kong

Hello Kitty murder
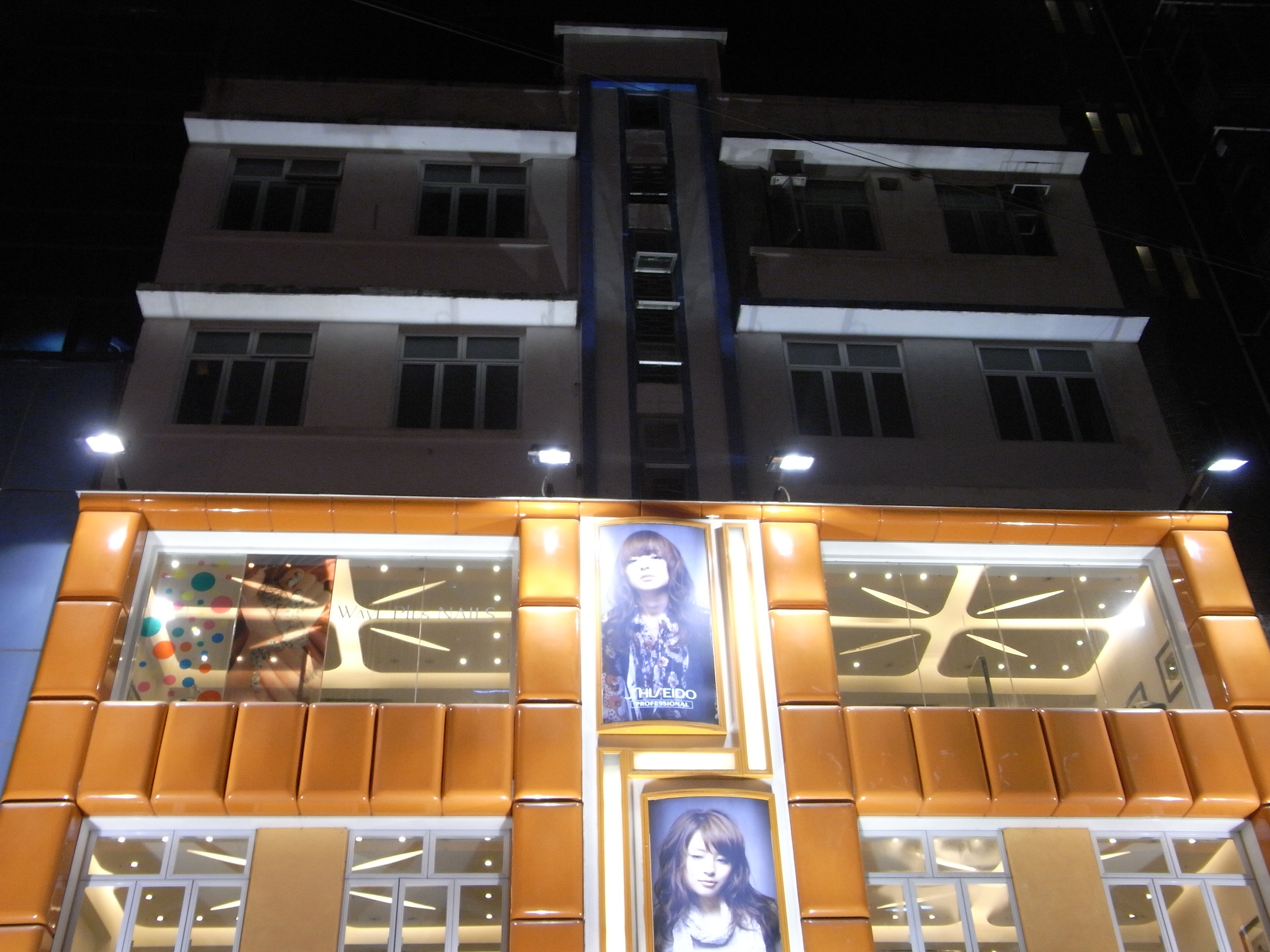
- No. 31 Granville Road, Tsim Sha Tsui, where the murder took place. (Note: The building involved is four stories high, with two units on each floor. The first to second floors are shops and the third to fourth floors are residential buildings. The right unit in the picture is Block A and the left unit is Penthouse B. The murder occurred on the third floor Block B. The building was demolished in 2012 and rebuilt into Soravit on Granville in 2016.)
- Location: Kidnapping: Fu Yiu House, Lai Yiu Estate, Kwai Chung, Hong Kong; Murder: No. 31, 3rd Floor, Block B Granville Road, Tsim Sha Tsui, Hong Kong
- Date: 17 March 1999 to 14–15 April 1999
- Attack type: Torture murder causing traumatic shock, kidnapping, rape, decapitation
- Weapons: Metal pipes, kitchen utensils, hot wax, melted plastic, spices
- Victims: Fan Man-yee (樊敏儀), aged 23
- Perpetrators: Chan Man-lok (陳文樂); Leung Wai-lun (梁偉倫); Leung Shing-cho (梁勝祖) (Note: A fourth participant, 14-year old Ah Fong (阿芳, real name Lau Ming-fong) testified against the other three perpetrators in exchange for immunity.)
- Motive: Inconclusive; possibly sadism
- Verdict: Guilty of manslaughter
- Sentence: Life imprisonment with the possibility of parole after 20 years Leung Shing-cho: Commuted to 18 years in prison
- Case Number: CACC 522/2000

Hello Kitty murder case
- Chinese: Hello Kitty藏屍案
- Literal meaning: Hello Kitty hidden body case
Transcriptions
Standard Mandarin
- Hanyu Pinyin: Hello Kitty cáng shī àn
Yue: Cantonese
- Yale Romanization: Hello Kitty chòhng sī ngon
- Jyutping: Hello Kitty cong4 si1 ngon3

The Hello Kitty murder case took place in Hong Kong in the spring of 1999, when a nightclub hostess was abducted in Lai Yiu Estate, and subsequently raped and tortured to death in an apartment in Tsim Sha Tsui, Kowloon.

23-year-old Fan Man-yee (樊敏儀; Fàahn Máhn-yìh) was held captive by three men and one girl before dying between 14 and 15 April 1999. Her body was decapitated and her skull was sewn inside a Hello Kitty mermaid plush.

== Background ==
Born in 1976 in Shenzhen, Fan Man-yee was abandoned by her family as a child, resulting in her being raised in an all girls' orphanage in Ma Tau Wai. When she turned 15, she was told to leave the orphanage because they had an age restriction. Becoming homeless and addicted to drugs, Fan was forced into street prostitution, and at age 21 began working at a brothel named Romance Villa, located in Sham Shui Po. Fan eventually married one of her clients, a fellow drug addict named Ng Chi-yuen (吳志遠; Wú Zhìyuǎn; Ǹgh Ji-yúhn), in 1996. She gave birth to their son two years later in November 1998, roughly five months before her murder.

Fan's husband was described as abusive and neighbours in their Mong Kok apartment building would report being awakened by sounds of the couple's fights and the child's screaming and crying. Upon her pregnancy and then the birth of her son, Fan decided to turn her life around in order to protect her son and provide him a safer life. She quit drugs and prostitution, got a job as a hostess at a nightclub named Empress Karaoke Club, and eventually left her violent husband shortly before her murder. Due to these sacrifices, she had a much lower income and struggled to support herself and her family.

== Kidnapping ==
Fan Man-yee, the Hello Kitty murder victim

Chan Man-lok (陳文樂; Chén Wénlè; Chàhn Màhn-ngohk; alias Ah Lok or Ah Hsi; born 17 May 1965), a 33-year-old Wo Shing Wo triad member who had exhibited problematic behavior since middle school and had previous convictions for drug trafficking (in 1991), was one of Fan's regular clients at the brothel. In early 1999, Fan stole Chan's wallet, which contained about $HK4,000 (roughly US$500). When Chan realized what had happened, he demanded Fan return the money in addition to a fee of $HK10,000. Although Fan immediately returned the stolen money, she needed more time to secure the additional fee.

On 17 March 1999, Fan was abducted by three men and one girl at her flat in the Fu Yiu section of Lai Yiu Estate: Chan; his 14-year-old grooming victim Lau Ming-fong (劉明芳; Liú Míngfāng; Làuh Mìhng-fōng; alias Ah Fong), 21-year-old Leung Wai-lun (梁偉倫; Liáng Wěilún; Lèuhng Wáih-lèuhn; alias Gangsta 1), and Lau's boyfriend Leung Shing-cho (梁勝祖; Liáng Shèngzǔ; Lèuhng Sing-zóu; alias Gangsta 2). The group took Fan to an apartment at No. 31 Granville Road, Tsim Sha Tsui, where they imprisoned her for a month. The apartment was rented by Chan himself, but was owned by two men referred to as Ah Sam and Ah Kao, who were not involved in gang activities. Initially, Chan had intended to make money off of Fan by pimping her out to other men.

Prior to the kidnapping, both Leung Wai-lun and Leung Shing-cho worked at a retail store nearby Granville Road.

== Ordeal ==
During her imprisonment, she was tortured and raped. According to one source, she was beaten with metal bars, sometimes while being strung up and used as a punching bag. On one occasion, Fan was kicked in the head around 50 times. Spices were rubbed into Fan's wounds, and her legs and feet were burned with candle wax and hot plastic so that she was not able to walk. She was forced to smile and say she enjoyed the beatings; if she refused, they subjected her to even harsher torture. This treatment eventually led to traumatic shock and ultimately death.

Fan succumbed to her wounds between 14 April and 15 April 1999. Some sources claim that she died while her captors were out, while others say she died overnight. Upon discovery of Fan's body, her captors dismembered and boiled the remains; her skull was sewn inside of a Hello Kitty doll filled with dead insects while the rest of the body was discarded.

== Discovery of the crime ==
Following the ordeal, the girl Lau started having nightmares of Fan's headless ghost every night at a girls' reform school which led her to the state of a nervous breakdown. With the help of the school's social worker, she was taken to the nearest police station. Three police officers, Chiu Ka-hsue, Sin Tim-wah and, Andrew Yip Yan-ling, all from the Yau Ma Tei Police Division No. 539, were the first officers who arrived at the scene, led by Lau on 24 May.

Fan Man-yee's skull, one tooth, and some internal organs in a plastic bag were recovered at the scene. Other parts were recovered from trash dumps in Sham Shui Po, Wan Chai, and Tai Kok Tsui.

At the time of the arrest, Chan was living with his wife Ah Pui (real name Tse Pui-ling, 謝佩玲; Xiè Pèilíng; Jeh Pui-lìhng) and his newborn baby at an apartment in the Shek Ning section of Shek Lei Estate. The apartment was raided by SWAT officers on the early morning hours of 28 May. Tse was first suspected to be involved in the murder, but was quickly released after no evidence was found. After finding out the murder made it to the media via a Macau-based local newspaper, Leung Wai-lun fled to mainland China (Guangxi) before getting caught by the police on 14 February 2000, after irregularities were found in his passport. Prior to the arrest, Leung was put on Interpol's most wanted list. He was sent back to Hong Kong on 17 February for trial.

Fan's skull was identified on 3 June, after a "photo overlapping method" at Lockhart Mortuary, and the skull was moved to Kowloon Public Mortuary after the trial.

== Trial ==
On 7 December 2000, after a trial which started on 20 October, the three men were convicted of manslaughter with a vote of 6:3, as the eight-man and one-woman jury ruled the remains were not sufficient to show whether Fan was murdered or died from a drug overdose of methamphetamine. While the jury could not rule that the men intended to kill Fan, they did determine that she had died as a result of their abuse. Lau testified at the trial in exchange for immunity. During the trial, Chan and Leung Shing-cho denied killing Fan, although they did not deny dismembering her body. Chan's wife Tse Pui-ling, Fan's husband Ng Chi-yuen, and Fan's aunt also testified in court. After the guilty verdict, Leung Wai-lun's sister reportedly experienced a mental breakdown, while Leung's brother slammed and broke the court door.

Justice Peter Nguyen, who sentenced the trio to life in prison with the possibility of parole, stated, "Never in Hong Kong in recent years has a court heard of such cruelty, depravity, callousness, brutality, violence, and viciousness." Psychiatric reports of Castle Peak Hospital and Siu Lam Hospital described the three as "remorseless". There would be no review for parole for twenty years. Chan Man-lok and Leung Wai-lun are currently serving their life sentences in Stanley Prison.

Former TVB reporters Carmen Luk and Mimi Yeung attended the trial, with Luk describing the court scene as "crazy and scary".

== Aftermath ==
Fan's skull was the only exhibit in the case. After the trial, it was kept by the forensic pathologist in the Kowloon Public Mortuary until the appeal process of the prisoners was completed, and her birth family was notified in March 2004 that the skull would be returned and cremated on 26 March.

The apartment building in which the crime took place was demolished in September 2012 and has been rebuilt as a hotel named Soravit in 2016. Three buddha portraits were placed in the hotel as a memorial.

The publicity around the case resulted in the production and release of films that told the story. Both 烹屍之喪盡天良 (Human Pork Chop) and There Is a Secret in My Soup were released in 2001.

Leung Shing-cho, who managed to have his sentence reduced from life to eighteen years on appeal in March 2004, was released in April 2014. Eight years later, Leung was arrested and sentenced to jail once again for twelve months in August 2022 for sexually assaulting a ten-year-old girl.

== See also ==
- 1995 Okinawa rape incident
- Eight Immortals Restaurant murders
- Lam Kor-wan
- List of kidnappings (1990–1999)
- List of solved missing person cases (1950–1969)
- Murder of Junko Furuta
- Murder of Abby Choi
