= Human Rights Monitor =

Human Rights Monitor may refer to:

- Euro-Mediterranean Human Rights Monitor (Euro-Med HRM)
- Hong Kong Human Rights Monitor
- Indonesitan Human Rights Monitor (IMPARSIAL); see Munir Said Thalib § Political activist career
