= Highland Park (Hong Kong) =

Public housing estate in Kwai Chung, Hong Kong

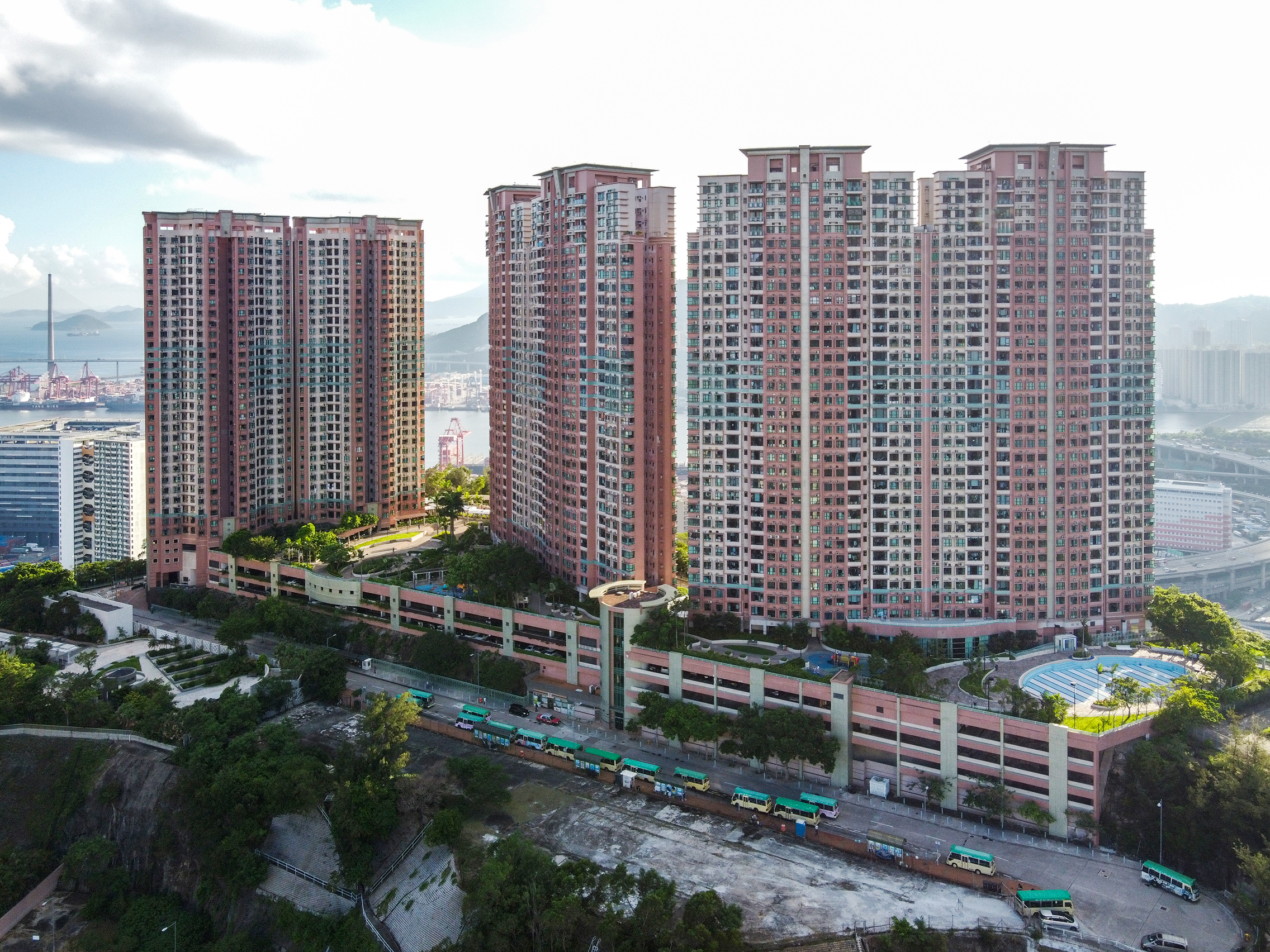
- Highland Park
- Interactive map of Highland Park

General information
- Location: 11 Lai Kong Street, Lai King; Kwai Chung; New Territories, Hong Kong
- Coordinates: 22.3492°N 114.1301°E
- Status: Completed
- Category: Sandwich Class Housing Scheme
- No. of blocks: 6
- No. of units: 1,456

Construction
- Constructed: 1999; 27 years ago
- Authority: Hong Kong Housing Society

Highland Park (Chinese: 浩景臺) is a Sandwich Class Housing Scheme estate developed by the Hong Kong Housing Society situated at the mid-level of Lai King Hill, Kwai Chung, New Territories, Hong Kong near Lai King Fire Station and Lai King Disciplined Services Quarters. Formerly the site of Lai King Temporary Housing Area (Chinese: 荔景臨時房屋區), it consists of six residential blocks completed in 1999.

== Houses ==
Name	Chinese name	Building type	Completed
Tower 1	第1座	Non-standard	1999
Tower 2	第2座	Non-standard	1999
Tower 3	第3座	Non-standard	1999
Tower 4	第4座	Non-standard	1999
Tower 5	第5座	Non-standard	1999
Tower 6	第6座	Non-standard	1999

== Politics ==
Highland Park is located in Cho Yiu constituency of the Kwai Tsing District Council. It was formerly represented by Choi Nga-man, who was elected in the 2019 elections until July 2021.

== Education ==
Highland Park is in Primary One Admission (POA) School Net 65, which includes multiple aided schools (schools operated independently of the government but funded with government money); none of the schools in the net are government schools.

== See also ==
- Public housing estates in Kwai Chung
