= 2011 Kwai Tsing District Council election =

Hong Kong local election

- 6 November 2011

29 (of the 35) seats to Kwai Tsing District Council 18 seats needed for a majority
- Turnout: 42.3%
	First party	Second party
Party	Democratic	DAB
Last election	9 seats, 28.0%	5 seats, 18.4%
Seats before	10	5
Seats won	9	5
Seat change	▼1	Steady
Popular vote	28,135	17,018
Percentage	28.6%	17.3%
Swing	▲0.6%	▼1.1%
	Third party	Fourth party
Party	NWSC	FTU
Last election	4 seats, 14.1%	0 seat, 1.4%
Seats before	3	1
Seats won	5	2
Seat change	▲2	▲1
Popular vote	12,921	9,234
Percentage	13.1%	9.4%
Swing	▼1.0%	▲8.0%
- Colours on map indicate winning party for each constituency.

The 2011 Kwai Tsing District Council election was held on 6 November 2011 to elect all 29 elected members to the 35-member District Council.

The Democratic Party remained the largest party despite its former chairman Lee Wing-tat lost his seat in Lai Wah to the Democratic Alliance for the Betterment and Progress of Hong Kong Chu Lai-ling. Although the pan-democracy camp won the majority of the seats, it was balanced by the appointed and ex officio seats.

== Overall election results ==
Before election:

↓
15	1	12
Pro-democracy	I.	Pro-Beijing

Change in composition:

↓
15	1	13
Pro-democracy	I.	Pro-Beijing

Kwai Tsing District Council election result 2011
Party	Seats	Gains	Losses	Net gain/loss	Seats %	Votes %	Votes	+/−
Democratic	9	0	1	−1	31.0	28.6	28,135	+0.6
Independent	8	1	1	0	27.6	23.4	23,050	
DAB	5	1	1	0	17.2	17.3	17,018	−1.1
NWSC	5	2	0	+2	17.2	13.1	12,921	−1.0
FTU	2	1	0	+1	5.7	9.4	9,234	+8.0
Civic	0	0	1	−1	0	2.7	2,621	
People Power	0	0	0	0	0	1.2	1,225	
Green	0	0	0	0	0	0.4	387	
