= 2015 Kwai Tsing District Council election =

Hong Kong local election

- 22 November 2015

29 (of the 30) seats to Kwai Tsing District Council 16 seats needed for a majority
- Turnout: 48.6%
	First party	Second party	Third party
Party	DAB	NWSC	Democratic
Last election	5 seats, 17.3%	5 seats, 13.1%	9 seats, 28.6%
Seats before	5	5	8
Seats won	8	5	4
Seat change	▲3	Steady	▼4
Popular vote	28,837	16,105	29,267
Percentage	24.7%	13.8%	25.0%
Swing	▲7.4%	▲0.7%	▼3.6%
	Fourth party	Fifth party	Sixth party
Party	FTU	BPA	NPP
Last election	2 seat, 9.4%	New party	Did not run
Seats before	2	4	1
Seats won	3	3	2
Seat change	▲1	▼1	▲1
Popular vote	9,968	8,954	3,141
Percentage	8.5%	7.7%	2.7%
Swing	▼0.9%	N/A	N/A
- Colours on map indicate winning party for each constituency.

The 2015 Kwai Tsing District Council election was held on 22 November 2015 to elect all 29 elected members to the 30-member Kwai Tsing District Council.

The pan-democracy camp failed to secure majority of the elected seats with Democratic Party lost its largest party status to the Democratic Alliance for the Betterment and Progress of Hong Kong (DAB).

== Overall election results ==
Before election:

↓
15	14
Pro-democracy	Pro-Beijing

Change in composition:

↓
11	1	17
Pro-democracy	I.	Pro-Beijing

Kwai Tsing District Council election result 2015
Party	Seats	Gains	Losses	Net gain/loss	Seats %	Votes %	Votes	+/−
Democratic	4	0	4	−4	13.8	25.0	29,267	–3.6
DAB	8	4	0	+4	27.6	24.7	28,837	+7.4
NWSC	5	0	0	0	17.2	13.8	16,105	+0.7
Independent	4	1	1	0	13.8	11.5	13,420	
FTU	3	1	0	+1	10.3	8.5	9,968	–0.9
BPA	3	0	1	–1	10.3	7.7	8,954	
NPP	2	1	0	+1	6.9	2.7	3,141	
Youngspiration	0	0	0	0	0	2.7	3,121	
FLU	0	0	0	0	0	1.4	1,624	
LSD	0	0	0	0	0	1.1	1,230	
CFLCG	0	0	0	0	0	0.2	282	
