= 2003 Kwai Tsing District Council election =

Hong Kong local election

- 23 November 2003

28 (of the 36) seats to Kwai Tsing District Council 19 seats needed for a majority
- Turnout: 44.8%
	First party	Second party	Third party
Party	Democratic	NWSC	DAB
Last election	10 seats, 25.1%	2 seats, 5.4%	2 seats, 19.5%
Seats before	10	2	2
Seats won	11	4	1
Seat change	▲1	▲2	▼1
Popular vote	19,642	12,761	18,818
Percentage	23.7%	15.4%	22.7%
Swing	▼1.4%	▲10.0%	▲3.2%
	Fourth party	Fifth party
Party	Liberal	HKPA
Last election	Did not contest	Did not contest
Seats before	1	1
Seats won	1	1
Seat change	Steady	Steady
Popular vote	3,113	2,298
Percentage	3.8%	2.8%
Swing	N/A	N/A
- Colours on map indicate winning party for each constituency.

The 2003 Kwai Tsing District Council election was held on 23 November 2003 to elect all 28 elected members to the 36-member District Council.

== Overall election results ==
Before election:

↓
21	7
Pro-democracy	Pro-Beijing

Change in composition:

↓
23	5
Pro-democracy	Pro-Beijing

Kwai Tsing District Council election result 2003
Party	Seats	Gains	Losses	Net gain/loss	Seats %	Votes %	Votes	+/−
Independent	10	0	1	−1	35.7	30.4	25,270	
Democratic	11	3	2	+1	39.3	23.7	19,642	−1.4
DAB	1	0	1	−1	3.6	22.7	18,818	+3.2
NWSC	4	2	0	+2	14.3	16.6	12,761	+10.0
Liberal	1	0	0	0	3.6	3.8	3,113	
HKPA	1	0	0	0	3.6	2.8	2,298	
ADPL	0	0	1	−1	0	1.4	1,149	−0.1
