= Hong Kong Human Rights Monitor =

Hong Kong non-governmental organisation

- Hong Kong Human Rights Monitor (logo based on Chinese character 人 meaning "person")
- Company type: Non-governmental organisation
- Founded: 1995, Hong Kong
- Website: www.hkhrm.org.hk www.facebook.com/hkhrm

The Hong Kong Human Rights Monitor (HKHRM; Chinese: 香港人權監察; pinyin: Xiānggǎng rénquán jiānchá) is a local non-governmental organisation which was established in April 1995. It aims to promote better human rights protection in Hong Kong.

The organisation is concerned about issues like National Security Laws or Article 23, immigration law, public service broadcasting, the police complaint system, the inspection of prisons, racial discrimination, sex discrimination and freedoms of association, assembly and expression etc.

One of the organisation's main aims is to educate the Hong Kong community to the human rights that they currently have, that they should have and that will better the community. This helps establish an awareness of the initial and potential Hong Kong human rights throughout society. The recent founding of the Hong Kong Human Rights Monitor Education Charitable Trust contributes constructively to the social awareness of basic and more complex human rights issues.

== Structure ==
1. Hong Kong Human Rights Monitor – membership comprises mainly Chinese born in Hong Kong with mandate on human rights and rule-of-law issues in Hong Kong.
2. Hong Kong Human Rights Monitor Education Charitable Trust – a charitable fund that promotes awareness of human rights among the people in Hong Kong.
3. Digital Library – holds human rights treaties and related documents in electronic format.
4. Resource and Information Centre – collects and distributes basic human rights information.

== Work ==
The work of HKHRM covers five broad areas:

1. Supporting human rights in Hong Kong
HKHRM observes the law, policies and actions of the government such as by participating in Legislative Council of Hong Kong hearings and holding campaigns on human rights issues and the rule of the law.

2. Ascertaining the human rights conditions in Hong Kong
HKHRM undertakes research on a variety of important topics including immigration law, constitutional matters, freedoms of association, assembly and expression, the conduct of the police, and the treatment of prisoners.

3. Telling the world about human rights in Hong Kong
HKHRM briefs the press, the United Nations, local and overseas governments and legislative bodies on Hong Kong human rights issues both orally and through written reports.

4. Public education about human rights
HKHRM publishes various educational materials about human rights in Chinese and/or English and distributes them to the public. Publications include a newsletter, teach-yourself human rights pamphlets and a calendar. The materials cover subject matter ranging from the Universal Declaration of Human Rights to anti-small circle election. It also delivers speeches at public occasions and organises evening classes on human rights.

5. Working on human rights-related issues
HKHRM handles cases referred to it by other non-governmental organisations that have significant implications for legal or institutional improvements. Its interest goes beyond individual citizens to concern public affairs such as police and immigration issues.

== Past events ==
=== Observation and inspection ===
HKHRM is active in observing the operation of government departments.

In the past, the HKHRM has held campaigns for improvements of the police complaint system, and even more in depth issues such as requesting an independent inquiry for Lee Shing Tat's victim case.

During the World Trade Organization Hong Kong Ministerial Conference 2005, there were many anti World Trade Organization demonstrations. HKHRM sent four members to observe the way Hong Kong Police handled the demonstrators. HKHRM Director Mr Law Yuk Kai claimed that the demonstrators were highly controlled but the police has over-reacted and lacked flexibility. He suggested more communication between the police and the demonstrators so as to lower the chance of misunderstanding.

Prior to the Legislative Council Election in 2004, HKHRM set up the “Election Administration Irregularities Report Hotline” to collect reports about election irregularities from the general public. They received over 15 calls from presiding officers, polling officers, voters and election representatives. Complaints included harsh condition for polling officers, unprofessional handling of votes and promotional activities in non-canvassing areas. Some election representatives reported that the process of ballot boxes sealing and vote counting could not be observed. As a reaction to the complaints, HKHRM urged Electoral Affairs Commission to investigate the reported issues.

HKHRM sometimes co-operates with international organisations in promoting human rights and observing the human rights condition in Hong Kong. When the Alliance for Reform and Democracy in Asia (ARDA) visited Hong Kong for a pre-election assessment in August 2004, the Monitor helped them organise meetings with representatives from different parties and sectors in Hong Kong. On 3 August, the Monitor and ARDA co-organized a press conference and briefing session in the Monitor’s Office to talk about the operation of the Electoral Affairs Commission (EAC) and the political and legal condition of Hong Kong. On the next day, ARDA and HKHRM met with the EAC together to scrutinise the election arrangements for the election in September.

=== Researches and reports ===
HKHRM regularly carries out investigations and generates reports about issues that are closely linked to human right issues.

Formerly, the HKHRM has also conducted reviews on issues such as the Hong Kong immigration law and the Hong Kong legal aid system and practice.

In July 2006, HKHRM submitted the second periodic report on the HKSAR of the People’s Republic of China in light of the Convention on the Elimination of All Forms of Discrimination against Women (CEDAW) to the United Nations. The report provides a background of the general political structure in Hong Kong and gives an overview of women's substantive rights in Hong Kong. It discusses issues like equality in employment and labour rights, domestic violence in ethnic minority families and split families and right of abode.

In 2000, HKHRM interviewed staff and residents in eight children's homes run by Social Welfare Department and obtained its findings from unannounced visits. Then, the Monitor presented press reports claiming that little has been done to improve the service of children’s home since a study in the early 1980s. Although the Department has reservations on some of the investigations and criticisms of the Monitor, the Department has planned further improvement measures for the two areas which the Monitor has commented, i.e. education service for residents and training for staff.

In February 1999, HKHRM submitted a report in respect of the HKSAR's initial report on herself under Article 18 of the Convention on the Elimination of All Forms of Discrimination Against Women. The report concerns many aspects of women's substantive rights including politics and female participation, education, welfare system, employment and health of women.

=== Meetings ===
HKHRM frequently meets with government officials and international organisations.

In the past, the HKHRM has called for human rights awareness using various resources and by contacting diverse and highly posted authorities concerned with human rights. In dealing with international organisations such as the United Nations, the HKHRM submitted reports calling for the UK and Hong Kong governments to refer to the treaties in which there is mention of certain territories whom should qualify to fall under international human rights.

In terms of the Hong Kong authoritative sphere, Monitor members have previously met with the Chief Executive of Hong Kong (Donald Tsang) and Governor to discuss a re-examination of police interrogation and complaint procedures.

In 2005, HKHRM formed a four-person delegation to the 34th session of the United Nations Committee on Economic, Social and Cultural Rights (CESCR) held in the United Nations Headquarters in Geneva. Together with other non-government organisations, HKHRM attended the hearing of China's report submitted in accordance with the International Covenant on Economic, Social and Cultural Rights. During the hearing, it expressed strong opposition to the exclusion of mainland Chinese new immigrants from the government's proposed Racial Discrimination Act. Besides, members elaborated their concern on issues such as the obstruction to democratic progress, polarisation of rich and poor and the slow progress of legislation against age discrimination and sexual orientation discrimination.

In 2002, HKHRM Director Mr Law Yuk Kai and the Democratic Party Chairperson Lee Chu Ming went on a one-week visit to the United States. They had meetings with a number of government officials and some non-governmental organisations. In the meetings, they explained the Article 23 legislation and its impact on the life and human rights of Hong Kong citizens. The media and government officials expressed understanding and concerns on the anxiety of the Hong Kong public.

The organisation also caught global attention as it joined the United Nations Human Rights Committee hearing in Geneva in 1999. This involvement will certainly help the organisation to learn more about the international context of human rights in Hong Kong and to gain further recognition from the local government.

In 1998, members of HKHRM met Tung Chee Hwa, the Chief Executive, and expressed their views on the issues of racial equality, the immigration appeal system, police monitoring and the pace of democratisation. Government support is received by the HKHRM after the meeting. The government shows its concern to the organisation and stresses its importance in Hong Kong.

=== Education ===
HKHRM is constantly invited to organise workshops and give talks to promote human rights.

In Hong Kong, many different communities in the society associate with and work together to hold some activities for the Human Rights Day every year since the United Nations adopted The Universal Declarion of Human Rights and set the date of 10 December as the International Human Rights Day in 1948. HKHRM is one of the communities which helps in the Human Rights Day.

In 2005, the Faculty of Law of the University of Hong Kong joint hands with HKHRM to present a talk entitled Sexual Orientation and Human Rights in Hong Kong.

In March 2005, on the Teachers Professional Training Day organised by the Professional Teachers Union, HKHRM delivered a talk to a group of 40 teachers about the need for human rights education. It also introduced the Monitor’s work in the education of human rights.

In 2005, HKHRM organised three street forums in Siu Sai Wan, Causeway Bay and Tseuk Kwan O for community education and as an effort to request for the abolition of the functional constituencies. Academics and Legislative Councilors were invited to explain to the public why the functional constituencies cannot guarantee a fair and just political system.

In 2004, HKHRM cooperated with The Hong Kong Council of Social Service and Oxfam Hong Kong and organised a workshop for social service practitioners called Workshop on Basic Concepts on Legislating Against Racial Discrimination.

== Current and future events ==
1. Forming group to monitor possible interference on the freedom of expression by the HKSAR Government and/or Central Chinese authorities on existing and future legislation.
2. Preparing the amicus curiae (Friend of the Court) documents on important constitutional matters.
3. Monitoring the self-censorship of the media and the possible threat to other media.
4. Carrying out research on existing laws on detention and imprisonment and proposing recommendations raised by the Monitor and Human Rights Watch.
5. Urging the HKSAR Government to outlaw racial discrimination by maintaining a record of cases of racial discrimination to illustrate the need for action on this issue.
6. Investigating issues on mental health and its implications on human rights.
7. Refreshing the homepage from time to time to make sure members and other interested individuals are able to keep track of the Monitor's activities and the human rights situation in Hong Kong.
8. Publishing and translating various human rights materials. This include booklets on women's rights, on the rights of minorities and on freedom of association and book on teaching human rights for teachers and video about human rights.
9. Establishing a human rights information centre including legislation, government and non-governmental organisation publications and newspaper clippings.
10. Continuing the police campaign which includes monitoring demonstrations, reforming the ineffective police complaints mechanism and improving the quality of autopsies by Government pathologists.

== Membership ==
Membership of the Monitor is only HK$100, making it affordable to the majority of the Hong Kong community. All members are informed through a newsletter about the functions and events that they are concerned about. Monitor members have the autonomy to choose when and how they want to collaborate and help promote HKHRM goals. Members are expected to fully understand and demonstrate a legitimate commitment to human rights and the rules and regulations of Hong Kong law.

== Funding ==
The HKHRM upholds and promotes its work through donations. The amount of work and research that could be done for a better human rights awareness in Hong Kong is affected by the amount of donations that come into the HKHRM fund. Donations are appreciated and non-refundable, but any legitimate donation is welcomed by the Monitor.

HKHRM received substantial funding from the National Endowment for Democracy, an organisation predominantly funded by the United States Department of State.

== Alliance ==
Hong Kong Human Rights Monitor is one of the member organisations of the Civil Human Rights Front (民間人權陣線). Other member organisations include the Democratic Party, The Frontier, Hong Kong Human Rights Commission, Hong Kong Journalists Association etc.

== Incidents ==
=== Rejection of applications ===
According to the HKHRM Director Law Yuk Kai, in 2003, a member with "concept different from the Monitor's" tried to allow tens of people join the Monitor just before the election of its chairperson and vice-chairperson. That member hoped to change the leading group by having people on his/her side taking part in the election and voting in it. However, their application for membership was rejected. According to the then chairperson, some senior members "succeeded in sticking to the Monitor's regulations" and claimed that those tens of people could not join the Monitor because they had not elaborately communicated with the Director Mr Law. Consequently, that member "with different concept" also left the Monitor. Those “regulations” can neither be found in the Monitor’s homepage nor their membership application form. According to the Monitor’s homepage, to join the Monitor, a person needs only to pay $100 and complete the application form. Besides, “the one essential qualification for membership is a genuine commitment to human rights and the rule of law” and “members... are free to take as much or as little part in the Monitor's activities”. It does not state that people have to contact the Director before they apply for membership. Neither has it given any definition for “genuine commitment to human rights and the rule of law”.

== See also ==
- Human rights in Hong Kong
- Hulu Concept
