= 1999 Kwai Tsing District Council election =

Hong Kong local election

- 28 November 1999

28 (of the 36) seats to Kwai Tsing District Council 19 seats needed for a majority
- Turnout: 37.7%
	First party	Second party
Party	Democratic	DAB
Last election	9 seats, 29.8%	0 seat, 1.4%
Seats before	7	0
Seats won	10	2
Seat change	▲3	▲2
Popular vote	15,294	11,831
Percentage	25.1%	19.5%
Swing	▼4.7%	▲18.1%
	Third party	Fourth party
Party	NWSC	ADPL
Last election	1 seat, 1.5%	6 seats, 21.7%
Seats before	2	1
Seats won	2	1
Seat change	Steady	Steady
Popular vote	3,295	885
Percentage	5.4%	1.5%
Swing	▲3.9%	▼20.2%
- Colours on map indicate winning party for each constituency.

The 1999 Kwai Tsing District Council election was held on 28 November 1999 to elect all 28 elected members to the 36-member District Council.

== Overall election results ==
Before election:

↓
21	5
Pro-democracy	Pro-Beijing

Change in composition:

↓
23	5
Pro-democracy	Pro-Beijing

Kwai Tsing District Council election result 2003
Party	Seats	Gains	Losses	Net gain/loss	Seats %	Votes %	Votes	+/−
Independent	13	2	5	−3	46.4	48.5	29,521	
Democratic	10	3	0	+3	35.7	25.1	15,294	−4.7
DAB	2	2	0	+2	7.1	19.5	11,831	+18.1
NWSC	2	0	0	0	7.1	5.4	3,295	+3.9
ADPL	1	0	0	0	3.6	1.5	885	−20.2
