= There Is a Secret in My Soup =

2001 Hong Kong film by Yeung Chi Kin

- 人頭豆腐湯
- Directed by: Yeung Chi Kin
- Release date: 2001
- Running time: 85 minutes
- Country: Hong Kong
- Language: Cantonese

There Is a Secret in My Soup
- Traditional Chinese: 人頭豆腐湯
- Simplified Chinese: 人头豆腐汤
Transcriptions
Standard Mandarin
- Hanyu Pinyin: Réntóu Dòufu Tāng
Yue: Cantonese
- Jyutping: jan4 tau4 dau6 fu6 tong1

There Is a Secret In my Soup (Chinese: 人頭豆腐湯; Jyutping: jan4 tau4 dau6 fu6 tong1) is a 2001 Hong Kong horror film directed by Yeung Chi Kin and based on the Hello Kitty murder case.

== Plot ==
Three triad gangsters kidnap and torture a young woman.

== Cast ==
- Cherry Chan as Maggie
- Chan Chung Wai
- Christy Cheung
- Co Co Chow
- Gabriel Harrison as Joe
- Benz Hui
- Hugo Ng as Rocky
- Angela Tong as Pat
- Michael Wong
- Timothy Zao

== Reception ==
On BeyondHollywood.com, James Mudge said the film "is truly the dreg of the Category III genre. It’s a poorly made and boring mess that aims for both titillation and horror, but fails badly on both counts."
