= 2007 Kwai Tsing District Council election =

Hong Kong local election

- 18 November 2007

28 (of the 36) seats to Kwai Tsing District Council 19 seats needed for a majority
- Turnout: 39.1%
	First party	Second party
Party	Democratic	DAB
Last election	11 seats, 23.7%	1 seat, 22.7%
Seats before	11	1
Seats won	9	4
Seat change	▼2	▲3
Popular vote	28,135	12,403
Percentage	28.0%	13.9%
Swing	▲4.3%	▼8.8%
	Third party	Fourth party
Party	NWSC	Liberal
Last election	4 seats, 15.4%	1 seat, 3.8%
Seats before	4	2
Seats won	4	1
Seat change	Steady	▼1
Popular vote	12,921	8,332
Percentage	14.1%	9.4%
Swing	▼1.1%	▲5.6%
- Colours on map indicate winning party for each constituency.

The 2007 Kwai Tsing District Council election was held on 18 November 2007 to elect all 28 elected members to the 36-member District Council.

== Overall election results ==
Before election:

↓
17	11
Pro-democracy	Pro-Beijing

Change in composition:

↓
15	13
Pro-democracy	Pro-Beijing

Kwai Tsing District Council election result 2011
Party	Seats	Gains	Losses	Net gain/loss	Seats %	Votes %	Votes	+/−
Independent	9	0	0	0	27.6	28.0	24,950	
Democratic	9	1	3	−2	31.0	28.0	24,919	
DAB	4	3	0	+3	14.3	18.4	16,372	
NWSC	4	1	1	0	14.3	14.1	12,565	
Liberal	1	0	1	−1	3.6	9.4	8,332	
FTU	0	0	0	0	0	1.4	1,254	
LSD	0	0	0	0	0	0.7	640	
