= S.T.F.A. Lee Shau Kee College =

Coordinates: 22°21′39″N 114°07′28″E

Shun Tak Fraternal Association Lee Shau Kee College
- 順德聯誼總會李兆基中學
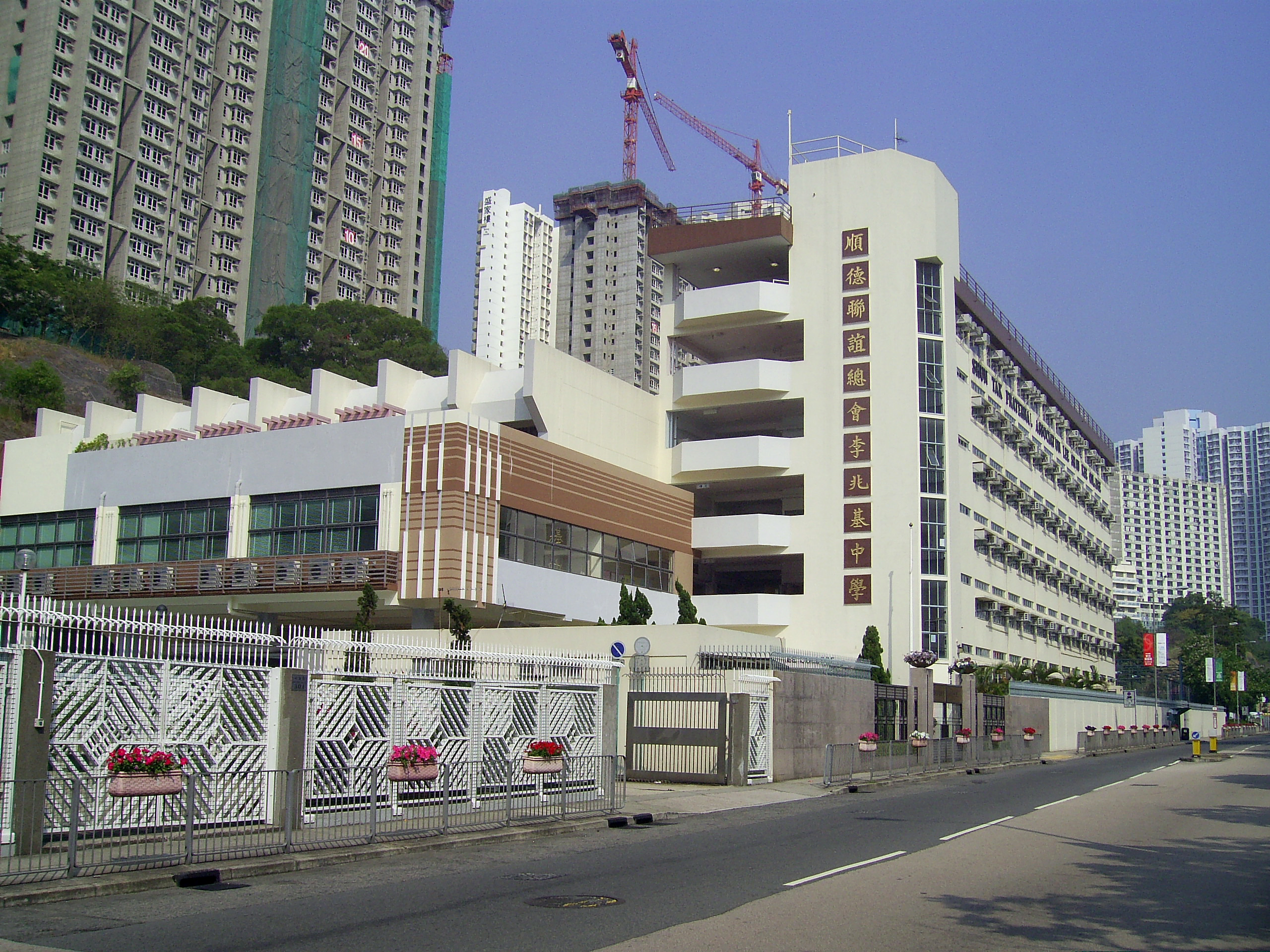

Location
- 303 Kwai Shing Circuit, Kwai Chung, New Territories, HK

Information
- School type: Aided Secondary School
- Motto: 文行忠信
- Established: c. 1978
- School district: Kwai Tsing District, Hong Kong
- Director: Mr. LO, Ho Wan 盧浩宏
- Principal: Dr. Yeung Man Tak 楊文德博士 (2024-)
- Grades: 4 classes in Form 1 to Form 6
- Colors: Red, Yellow, Green, Blue
- Affiliation: Shun Tak Fraternal Association
- Website: Home lskc.edu.hk Alumni: alumni.lskc.edu.hk LSKC Parent-Teacher Association lskc.edu.hk/index.php/links/parent-teacher-association Instagram www.instagram.com/stfa.lskc/

S.T.F.A. Lee Shau Kee College is a secondary school located in 303 Kwai Shing Circuit, Kwai Chung, N.T., Hong Kong. It is managed by the Shun Tak Fraternal Association.

== History ==
S.T.F.A. Lee Shau Kee College was originally an orphanage, Lee Ching Yee Childcare Centre. The college was transformed into a full-time school in 1978, thanks for donations from Lee Shau Kee, a property developer and majority owner of Henderson Land Development.

== Principals ==
- 1978–1996: Dr Chui Hong Sheung
- 1996–2012: Mr. Tsang Yat Ming
- 2012–2020: Mr. Tang Cheuk Chong
- 2020-2024: Ms. Cheung Hau Yan
- 2024-: Dr. Yeung Man Tak
