= Hulu Culture =

Hong Kong–based non-profit organisation

- 文化葫蘆
- Formation: 2009
- Type: Non-governmental organization
- Location: Hong Kong
- Key people: Simon Go (吳文正); Iman Fok (霍天雯)
- Website: www.huluhk.org

Hulu Culture
- Traditional Chinese: 文化葫蘆
- Simplified Chinese: 文化葫芦
Transcriptions
Standard Mandarin
- Hanyu Pinyin: Wénhuà Húlu
Yue: Cantonese
- Jyutping: man4 faa3 wu4 lou4*2

Hulu Culture (Chinese: 文化葫蘆) is a Hong Kong–based non-profit organisation established in 2009 that endeavors to protect Hong Kong traditional culture and heritage. Based in Kwai Chung Town in the New Territories, it is partly funded by the Hong Kong Jockey Club. In August 2013 the organisation also received a grant of $1,515,600 from the Government of Hong Kong for their "Energising Kowloon East: Sustainable Development of Made in Hong Kong Project".

== Background ==
=== Etymology ===
The name "Hulu Culture" comes from a Chinese mythological story in which Iron-Crutch Li, one of the Eight Immortals, had a calabash or hulu (葫蘆), full of universal cures, which he used for the good of the common people. "Hulu Culture" represents a traditional popular sense of diversification and embraces a wide sector of the community, reflecting the myth.

=== Mission ===
Hulu Concept was founded in 2004 to preserve and carry forward Hong Kong's traditional culture. It later became the organisation Hulu Culture, in 2009. The group assists local authors in the publication of their works and at the same time searches for stories and objects which usually go unnoticed or have been forgotten. Hulu Culture has held various large and small scale exhibitions and seminars with community culture as their themes, to which artists, scholars and students have been invited to participate and share their expertise. Hulu's mission is to spread the message that Hong Kong is an interesting and colorful big city to a worldwide audience through its efforts to promote traditional culture and heritage. In addition, its goal is to contribute to renewing local culture in the context of urban economic development.

=== Foundation ===
Hulu Culture was founded by Simon Go (吳文正), who grew up in Kowloon City, Hong Kong where he found that the old groceries stores and shops fostered a feeling of nostalgia. He graduated from The Hong Kong Polytechnic University with a design degree and had been working as a photo-journalist for over 10 years before he started his career in culture preservation. Go's photos focus on lower-class citizens and in the 1990s, he held an exhibition to show the true face of poverty behind social prosperity. Besides photography, he is also dedicated to recording the lifestyles of Hong Kong's people through interviews. Ho's wife, Iman Fok (霍天雯 pinyin Huò Tiānwén), who is a social worker by profession, also decided to join Hulu Culture as the chief executive to assist with cultural preservation.

=== Funding ===
Hulu Culture has received over four million Hong Kong dollars in donations from the Hong Kong Jockey Club.

== Activities ==
Hulu concept uses artistic and multimedia materials to present “themes” or “locations” of HongKong through words and images and is in the process of providing a research and online resource centre. Resultant research findings will become virtual exhibitions available via the organisation's web site. Expansion of such materials aims to allow the public, including artists, cultural workers and the younger generation to get in touch with local community culture while also providing teaching materials for general education courses to aid in understanding community history and culture. Seminars and workshops are planned periodically where scholars speak on local culture while academic workshops will provide guided cultural tours as community events.

== Publications ==
- 2004 August "Hong Kong Apothecary" (香港葫蘆賣乜藥) by Simon Go
- 2005 May "Hong Kong Photographers Series" (香港攝影師系列) by multiple authors)
- 2007 July "Mandala Afterdark" (萬籟有光) by Blues Wong (明凡)
- 2007 July "Hong Kong Walled City" (香港地) by Wong Kan Tai (黃勤帶)
- 2008 April "Hong Kong Old Shops" (街坊老店) by Simon Go
- 2008 July "Themeless Parks" (係‧唔係樂園) by Dustin Shum (岑允逸)
- 2009 February "Happy Hong Kong" (鬼馬香港) by Fu Chun Wai (傳俊偉)
- 2009 August "Heaven King and Earth Queen" (皇天后土) by Tom Fischer (謝至德)
- 2009 August "Dialogue with The Bed" (與床對話) by Tim Li (李民偉)
- 2009 September "Who is she" (她是誰) by So Ming Tsz (蘇明子)
- 2009 October "A Teardrop" (1.0_淚) by Lai Chiu Wan (黎超韞)
- 2009 October "Buried Alive: VICTORIA" (活埋‧維多利亞) by Fung Hon Chu (馮漢柱)

== Exhibitions ==
- Hong Kong Apothecary. Traditional Chinese medicine (TCM), an influential facet of Chinese cultures, is a combination of philosophy and traditional cultures. Simon Go spent more than four years collecting folk ideas and produced the book Hong Kong Apothecary: A Visual History of Chinese Medicine. The organisation has also created the "Hong Kong Apothecary", an exhibition that allows interaction between the public and these traditional products.
- Orchestration: Hong Kong Old Shops. This exhibition was held in September 2007, and the theme was “traditional old shops”. The productions were also from Simon Go, who visited different traditional shops in Hong Kong, taking photos of them so as to preserve their existence. The photos each has a story behind and they show that community wisdom was introduced under social limitations. This exhibition received unexpectedly good response, having been visited by more than 200 people within 2 days.
- "Can I help you?" exhibition. Noted photographer Simon Go worked with the local illustrator Stella So. Combining black-and-white photos and coloured illustrations, the real face of traditional old shops was presented. Hulu Concept has tried different exhibition methods by combining different artistic media.
- Hong Kong Britain. Held in July 2007, the author's aims were to express Hong Kong’s post colonial social conditions. Throughout the exhibition, reflections on citizens’ lives were guided.
- Happy Hong Kong. Many people in Hong Kong were greatly affected by the 2008 financial crisis. This exhibition is famous of its aim of boosting up Hong Kong people, turning them from a dark side to a brighter one by showing the true tenderness among them. As it suits people of different classes, it attracted attention due its ability to surprises the audience.
- Dialogue with the Bed. This exhibition was held to provide a place with the public where dialogues with space were encouraged. Folding beds were used as the language, communicating with the public about the reflections of the urban environment, society and life.
- Infinite Possibilities Unfold. After "Dialogue with the bed", its creator, Lei Man Wai (李民偉), was again invited by Hulu Concept for his art creations. Folding beds were used again which were placed just in front of the Lion Rocks of HSBC. Using folding beds, the author hoped that the public would reflect on public art objects as something belonging to everyone in Hong Kong.
- Forty years of Hong Kong Housing exhibition. According to its creators, family is a good topic which can easily bring resonance to the public. A family composes of people and furniture. All the furniture is designed and placed by the people and thus is filled with emotions and thoughts. When society changes, thoughts of people will change at the same time. Settings in a flat will then change also. This exhibition aims at promoting an interchange of spirit with the visitors.
- Cultural& Architecture Tours in West Kowloon. Between 19 December 2009 and 27 February 2010, two tours were guided through West Kowloon to appreciate Hong Kong traditional culture through various architectures and other sites, including Lee Wo Steelyard, Hing Wah Tailors, Shing Cheong Watches, Wing Hong Herbal Medicine, Luk Ping Kee Copper Ware, Gan Ming Framing, Fung Moon Kee, Woo Wo Shing Gold& Jewellery and New Asia Barber.
- HAD (Heritage×Arts×Design) Walk. This crossover exhibition of heritage, arts and design aimed at igniting public interest in local cultures, thereby fostering creative industries and cultures. Teenagers' creativity can be inspired through workshops and participation in community art. It took place at the Former Hollywood Road Police Married Quarters.
- Dining at the Lower Ngau Tau Kok Estate. Also called "Farewell to The Last Resettlement Public Rental Housing Exhibition". As Blocks 8 to 14 of the Lower Ngau Tau Kok Estate were scheduled for demolition, this exhibition was instigated to provide the chance for people to experience Lower Ngau Tau Kok Estate's living style, its indigenous culture and explore the Hong Kong spirit in the face of hardship.
