= Alice Mak (politician) =

Hong Kong politician

The Honourable Alice Mak Mei-kuen SBS JP
- 麥美娟
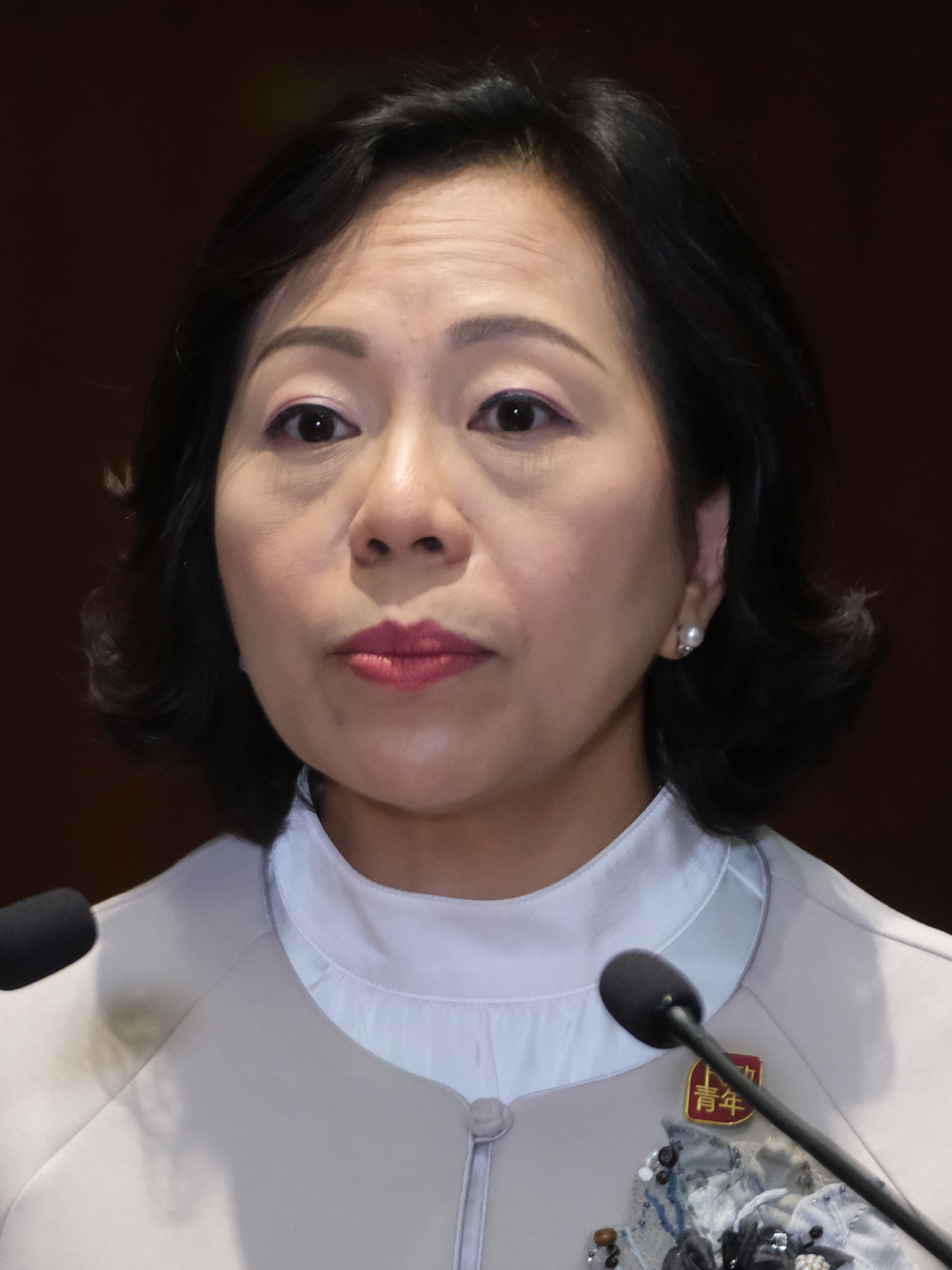
- Mak in 2023

Secretary for Home and Youth Affairs
- Incumbent
- Assumed office 1 July 2022
- Preceded by: Position established

Member of the Legislative Council
- In office 1 January 2022 – 18 June 2022
- Preceded by: New constituency
- Succeeded by: Adrian Ho
- Constituency: Election Committee
- In office 1 October 2012 – 31 December 2021
- Preceded by: Wong Kwok-hing
- Succeeded by: Constituency abolished
- Constituency: New Territories West

Member of the Kwai Tsing District Council
- In office 1 October 1994 – 31 December 2019
- Preceded by: New constituency
- Succeeded by: Sin Ho Fai
- Constituency: Wai Ying

Personal details
- Born: 1 November 1971 (age 54) Hong Kong
- Party: Hong Kong Federation of Trade Unions
- Education: CNEC Christian College; Chinese University of Hong Kong
- Occupation: Legislative Councillor

Chinese name
- Traditional Chinese: 麥美娟
- Simplified Chinese: 麦美娟
Transcriptions
Standard Mandarin
- Hanyu Pinyin: Mài Měijuān
Yue: Cantonese
- Yale Romanization: Mahk Méih-gyūn
- Jyutping: Mak^{6} Mei^{5}-gyun^{1}

Alice Mak Mei-kuen SBS JP (Chinese: 麥美娟; born 1 November 1971) is a Hong Kong politician, currently serving as Secretary for Home and Youth Affairs. She was formerly a member of the Legislative Council of Hong Kong for the Election Committee, representing the Hong Kong Federation of Trade Unions. She graduated from Department of English of the Chinese University of Hong Kong. She has been a member of the Kwai Tsing District Council since 1993, and represented the Wai Ying constituency until 2019.

== Political career ==
Mak was handpicked by Wong Kwok-hing to run in the 2012 Hong Kong legislative election. She came in 8th place after Civic Party's Kwok Ka-ki received the most votes, and was elected to the Legislative Council of Hong Kong with 7.07% electorate support. Mak also participated in the 2016 legislative election, coming in 6th place after popular localist camp Eddie Chu topped the race with the most votes. She kept her seat on the Legislative Council after receiving 49,680 votes, which represented 8.32% of the electorate.

She lost her seat in the District Council during the 2019 elections following a general rout of pro-Beijing candidates amidst the 2019–20 Hong Kong protests. She was defeated by Civic Party's Henry Sin Ho-fai, losing to him with 40.12% of the votes. Mak admitted that she, along with other pro-establishment candidates, lost because the Hong Kong government "provoked many people with its way of administering".

On 18 June 2022, she resigned from the Legislative Council to become Hong Kong's Secretary for Home and Youth Affairs.

== Controversies and views ==
=== Insulting Carrie Lam with profanities ===
During the 2019–20 Hong Kong protests, Chief Executive Carrie Lam called for a meeting on 18 June with pro-Beijing lawmakers in Government House to explain her reasoning for suspending the controversial 2019 Hong Kong extradition bill. It was reported that Mak, who had publicly supported the bill in solidarity with the government up to this point, berated the chief executive for around five minutes using Cantonese profanities until Lam appeared to be in tears, to which Mak retorted in tears, "what use is crying now? You know how to cry, I do too!". The account was confirmed by a leaked conversation between pro-Beijing lawmaker Christopher Cheung and Independent Police Complaints Council chairman Anthony Neoh, who did not realise their microphones were still on during their breaks.

On 19 June, Mak was asked about the truthfulness of the account, but Mak refused to reveal the details of the meeting, stressing that the pro-Beijing camp does not support the government blindly. Hong Kong's two civil service unions, the Hong Kong Chinese Civil Servants’ Association and the Federation of Civil Service Unions, urged Mak to address the accusation and apologise to Carrie Lam if the reports were true.

=== National security law ===
In October 2020, Mak pushed for an inquiry into whether filibustering at LegCo should be considered illegal, against the newly-enacted National Security Law.

=== Flag raising ===
In February 2021, Mak insisted that universities in Hong Kong should be mandated to hold a weekly flag-raising ceremony of the PRC flag.

=== Patriots ===
In March 2021, Mak supported changes proposed by the NPCSC to allow only "patriots" to govern Hong Kong, and claimed that the public was being misled by foreign forces, claiming that "I think the [Hong Kong] government should explain the articles in the Constitution [that electoral reform is under the NPC's purview], otherwise the public will be misled by these wrongful arguments put forward by foreign forces."

In April 2021, Mak claimed of the changes that "This is for the benefit of the whole society, so I hope the people of Hong Kong will vote in the coming election and I do hope that we'll have a high voting rate" and that the government should spread more propaganda on the changes.

=== Passports ===
In April 2021, Mak said that candidates to the Legislative Council should disclose if they have foreign passports, including BN(O) passports.

=== Police state ===
In June 2021, Mak said that there would be nothing wrong if Hong Kong were a police state; later, she claimed she was being sarcastic.

=== Youth Development Blueprint ===
In December 2022, Mak said of youth that "We think understanding the nation is the first step of growing-up," and the Youth Development Blueprint would encourage nationhood, China's history, the Basic Law, and strengthening their sense of nationality.

=== District Council ===
In May 2023, after the government announced plans to reduce the number of democratically elected District Council seats, Ming Pao newspaper published a cartoon which made fun of the changes; Mak said she strongly condemned the cartoon.

In July 2023, Mak said that people should not be concerned with low voter turnout for the next district council elections, saying "The voter turnout rate is affected by many factors, for example there is a rain, or the current weather which can reach up to 40°C, or the previous typhoon… Voter turnout rate is not the only factor we consider." A government office announced that 2023 was the second consecutive year in which voter registration dropped, including a 10% drop in voters under age 30.

=== Glorious Fast Food artwork ===
In August 2023, the Home Affairs Bureau warned that artwork outside of a restaurant could violate the national security law and said "When we saw the artwork, my colleagues issued reminders that it might be easily associated with [black violence or Hong Kong independence]." Mak dismissed concerns over its removal, though Legislative Council member Gary Zhang Xinyu disagreed and said private property rights should be respected.

== Personal life ==
On 23 February 2022, Mak was the second lawmaker after Edmund Wong to have tested positive for COVID-19.

Political offices
| New constituency | Member of Kwai Tsing District Council; Representative for Wai Ying; 2000–2019 | Succeeded by Sin Ho-fai |
| New title | Secretary for Home and Youth Affairs; 2022–present | Incumbent |
Legislative Council of Hong Kong
| Preceded by Wong Kwok-hing | Member of Legislative Council; Representative for New Territories West; 2012–2021 | Constituency abolished |
| New constituency | Member of Legislative Council; Representative for Election Committee; 2022–2022 | Succeeded by Adrian Ho |
Order of precedence
| Preceded by Kenneth Leung; Member of the Legislative Council | Hong Kong order of precedence Member of the Legislative Council | Succeeded by Kwok Ka-ki; Member of the Legislative Council |
