= Wai Ying (constituency) =

Constituency of the Kwai Tsing District Council of Hong Kong

- Elected constituency for the Kwai Tsing District Council
- Boundary of Wai Ying in Kwai Tsing District
- District: Kwai Tsing
- Legislative Council constituency: New Territories South West
- Population: 19,475 (2019)
- Electorate: 11,038 (2019)

Current constituency
- Created: 1994
- Number of members: One
- Member: vacant
- Created from: Wai Hoi, Hang Wai

Wai Ying, formerly called Wai Hoi and Hang Wai, is one of the 31 constituencies in the Kwai Tsing District in Hong Kong.

The constituency returns one district councillor to the Kwai Tsing District Council, with an election every four years. Wai Ying constituency is loosely based on Tierra Verde, Tivoli Garden and Broadview Garden in Tsing Yi with an estimated population of 19,475.

== Councillors represented ==
| Election | Member | Party |
|---|---|---|
| 1994 | Alice Mak Mei-kuen | Independent |
| 2007 | Alice Mak Mei-kuen | FTU |
| 2019 | Henry Sin Ho-fai→vacant | Civic |
| 2020 | Henry Sin Ho-fai→vacant | Independent |

== Election results ==
=== 2010s ===
Kwai Tsing District Council Election, 2019: Wai Ying
| Party | Candidate | Votes | % | ±% |
|---|---|---|---|---|
| Civic | Henry Sin Ho-fai | 5,194 | 59.88 | +25.78 |
| FTU | Alice Mak Mei-kuen | 3,480 | 40.12 | −25.78 |
| Majority | | 1,714 | 19.76 | |
| Turnout | | 8,703 | 78.85 | |
| Civic gain from FTU | | Swing | | |

Kwai Tsing District Council Election, 2015: Wai Ying
| Party | Candidate | Votes | % | ±% |
|---|---|---|---|---|
| FTU | Alice Mak Mei-kuen | Uncontested | | |
| FTU hold | | Swing | | |

Kwai Tsing District Council Election, 2011: Wai Ying
| Party | Candidate | Votes | % | ±% |
|---|---|---|---|---|
| FTU | Alice Mak Mei-kuen | 2,404 | 65.9 | −10.1 |
| Civic | Koo Man-hon | 1,242 | 34.1 | |
| FTU hold | | Swing | | |

=== 2000s ===
Kwai Tsing District Council Election, 2007: Wai Ying
| Party | Candidate | Votes | % | ±% |
|---|---|---|---|---|
| Independent | Alice Mak Mei-kuen | 2,216 | 76.0 | +5.1 |
| Independent | Fung Siu-ping | 701 | 24.0 | |
| Independent hold | | Swing | | |

Kwai Tsing District Council Election, 2003: Wai Ying
| Party | Candidate | Votes | % | ±% |
|---|---|---|---|---|
| Independent | Alice Mak Mei-kuen | 2,386 | 70.9 | +24.3 |
| Independent | Chan Wai-tong | 981 | 29.1 | |
| Independent hold | | Swing | | |

Kwai Tsing District Council Election, 1999: Wai Hoi
| Party | Candidate | Votes | % | ±% |
|---|---|---|---|---|
| Independent | Alice Mak Mei-kuen | 1,306 | 46.6 | |
| Independent | Alice Ho Pui-yin | 556 | 19.8 | |
| Democratic | Wong Kwong-mo | 535 | 19.1 | |
| TYRA | Tang Yuk-choi | 392 | 14.0 | |
| Independent win (new seat) | | | | |
