= Lai King Estate =

Public housing estate in Kwai Chung, Hong Kong

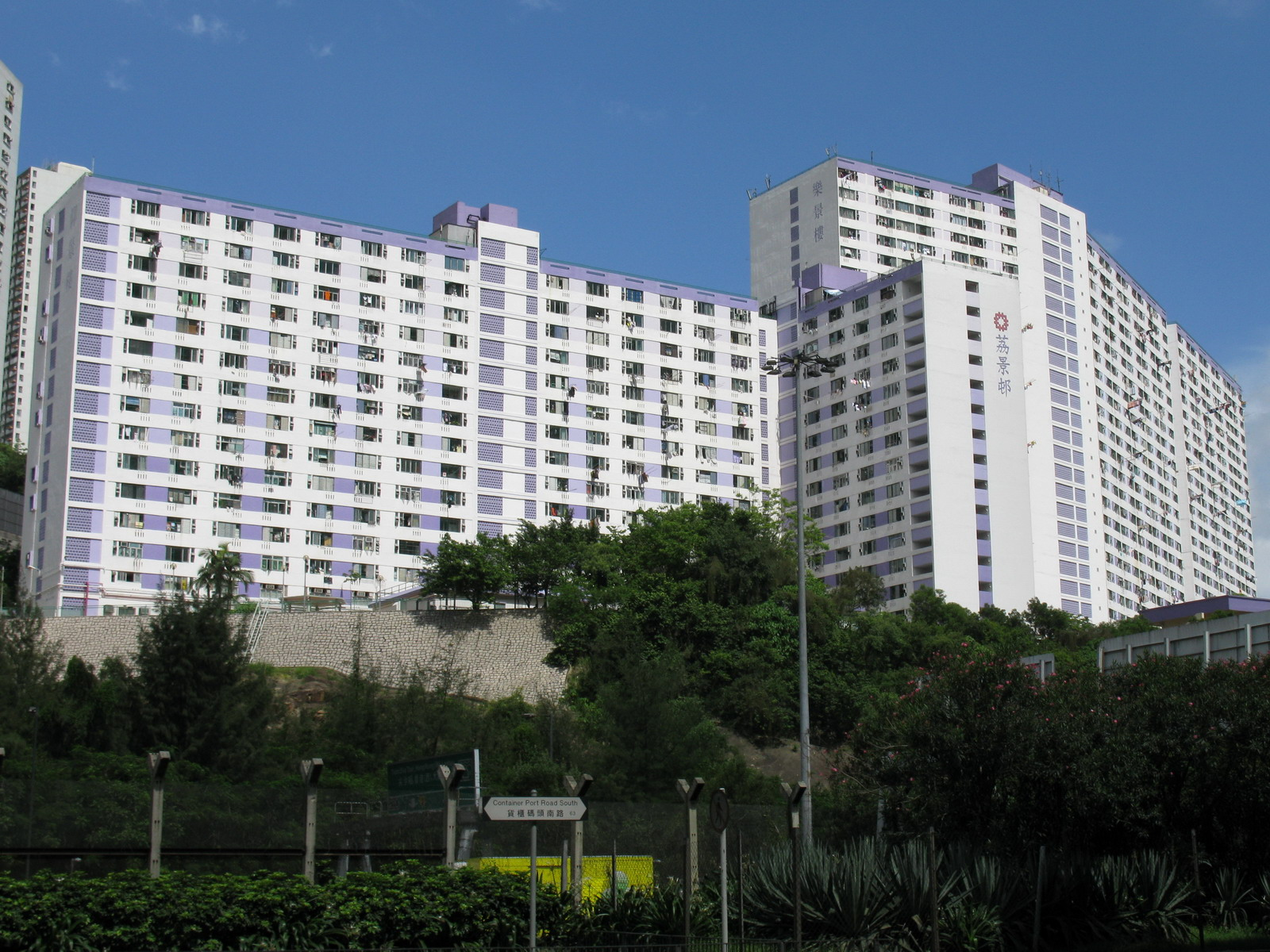
- Lai King Estate
- Interactive map of Lai King Estate

General information
- Location: Lai King Hill Road, Lai King; Kwai Chung; New Territories, Hong Kong
- Coordinates: 22.3469007°N 114.1257057°E
- Status: Completed
- Category: Public rental housing
- Population: 10,530 (2021)
- No. of blocks: 8
- No. of units: 4,800

Construction
- Constructed: 1975; 51 years ago
- Authority: Hong Kong Housing Authority

Lai King Estate (Chinese: 荔景邨) is a public housing estate in Lai King, Kwai Chung, New Territories, Hong Kong and is one of the oldest public housing estates in Kwai Tsing District. It is divided into two phases and consists of a total of eight residential buildings completed in 1975 (Phase 1), 1976 (Phase 2) and 2022 (Heng King House) respectively. Lai King station is located between the two phases.

Yuet Lai Court (悅麗苑) and Yin Lai Court (賢麗苑) are Home Ownership Scheme housing courts in Kwai Chung near Lai King Estate, built in 1981 and 1991 respectively.

== Houses ==
=== Lai King Estate ===
Name	Chinese name	Building type	Main contractor	Completed
Fung King House	風景樓	Old Slab (Resettlement Block Mark VII)	Wan Hin & Co Ltd (Tak Wing Construction 德榮建築)	1975
Wo King House	和景樓	Old Slab (Resettlement Block Mark VII)	Wan Hin & Co Ltd (Tak Wing Construction 德榮建築)	1975
Yat King House	日景樓	Old Slab (Resettlement Block Mark VII)	Wan Hin & Co Ltd (Tak Wing Construction 德榮建築)	1975
Ming King House	明景樓	Old Slab (Resettlement Block Mark VII)	Wan Hin & Co Ltd (Tak Wing Construction 德榮建築)	1975
Yeung King House	仰景樓	Old Slab (Resettlement Block Mark VII)	On Lee & Co (On Lee SIU Construction) 安利(蕭氏)建築有限公司	1976
On King House	安景樓	Old Slab (Resettlement Block Mark VII)	On Lee & Co (On Lee SIU Construction) 安利(蕭氏)建築有限公司	1976
Lok King House	樂景樓	Old Slab (Resettlement Block Mark VII)	On Lee & Co (On Lee SIU Construction) 安利(蕭氏)建築有限公司	1976
Heng King House	恆景樓	Non-Standard (Linear Block)	Great Harvest Group (Aggressive Construction) 興聯集團(精進建築有限公司)	2022

=== Yuet Lai Court ===
Name	Chinese name	Building type	Completed
Lai Wan House	麗雲閣	Non-standard	1981
Lai Wah House	麗華閣	Non-standard	1981
Lai Ha House	麗霞閣	Non-standard	1981
Lai Hung House	麗虹閣	Non-standard	1981

=== Yin Lai Court ===
Name	Chinese name	Building type	Completed
Yin Kwong House	賢光閣	Flexi 3	1991
Yin Tak House	賢德閣	Flexi 3	1991

== Demographics ==
According to the 2021 Census, Lai King Estate had a population of 10,530. The median age was 53.1 and the majority of residents (97 per cent) were of Chinese ethnicity. The average household size was 2.6 people. The median monthly domestic household income stood at HK$17,910, whereas the median monthly household income for economically active households was HK$23,540.

== Politics ==
Lai King Estate, Yuet Lai Court and Yin Lai Court are located in Lai King constituency of the Kwai Tsing District Council. It was formerly represented by Wong Tin-yan, who was elected in the 2019 elections until July 2021.

== See also ==
- Public housing estates in Kwai Chung
