= Lai King =

- Chinese: 茘景
Transcriptions
Standard Mandarin
- Hanyu Pinyin: Lìjǐng
Yue: Cantonese
- Yale Romanization: Laih gíng
- Jyutping: Lai6 ging2

Lai King Hill
- Traditional Chinese: 荔景山
Transcriptions
Yue: Cantonese
- Yale Romanization: Laih gíng sāan
- Jyutping: Lai6 ging2 saan1

Lai King, or Lai King Hill, is the colloquial name for a residential area including a number of private housing and public housing estates, located on Mo Shek Shan (Chinese: 磨石山), east of Kwai Chung, New Territories, Hong Kong. It is centred on Lai King Estate, but also refers to nearby public estates, including Cho Yiu Chuen, Lai Yiu Estate, Wah Yuen Chuen, and Kau Wa Keng, and private estates, such as Wonderland Villas and Highland Park.

== Transport ==
Lai King has a very important MTR interchange station between the Tsuen Wan line and the Tung Chung line.

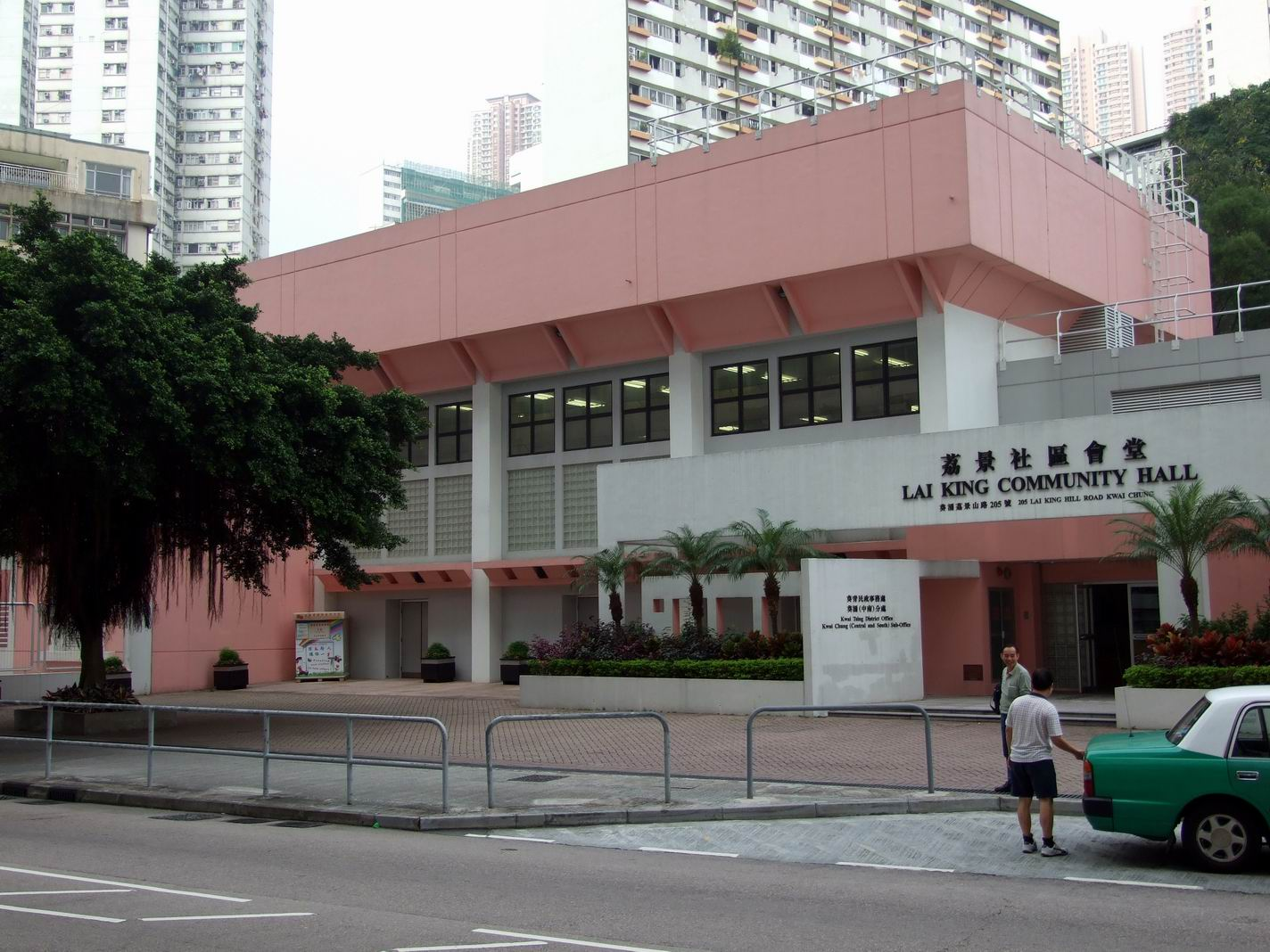
Lai King Community Hall

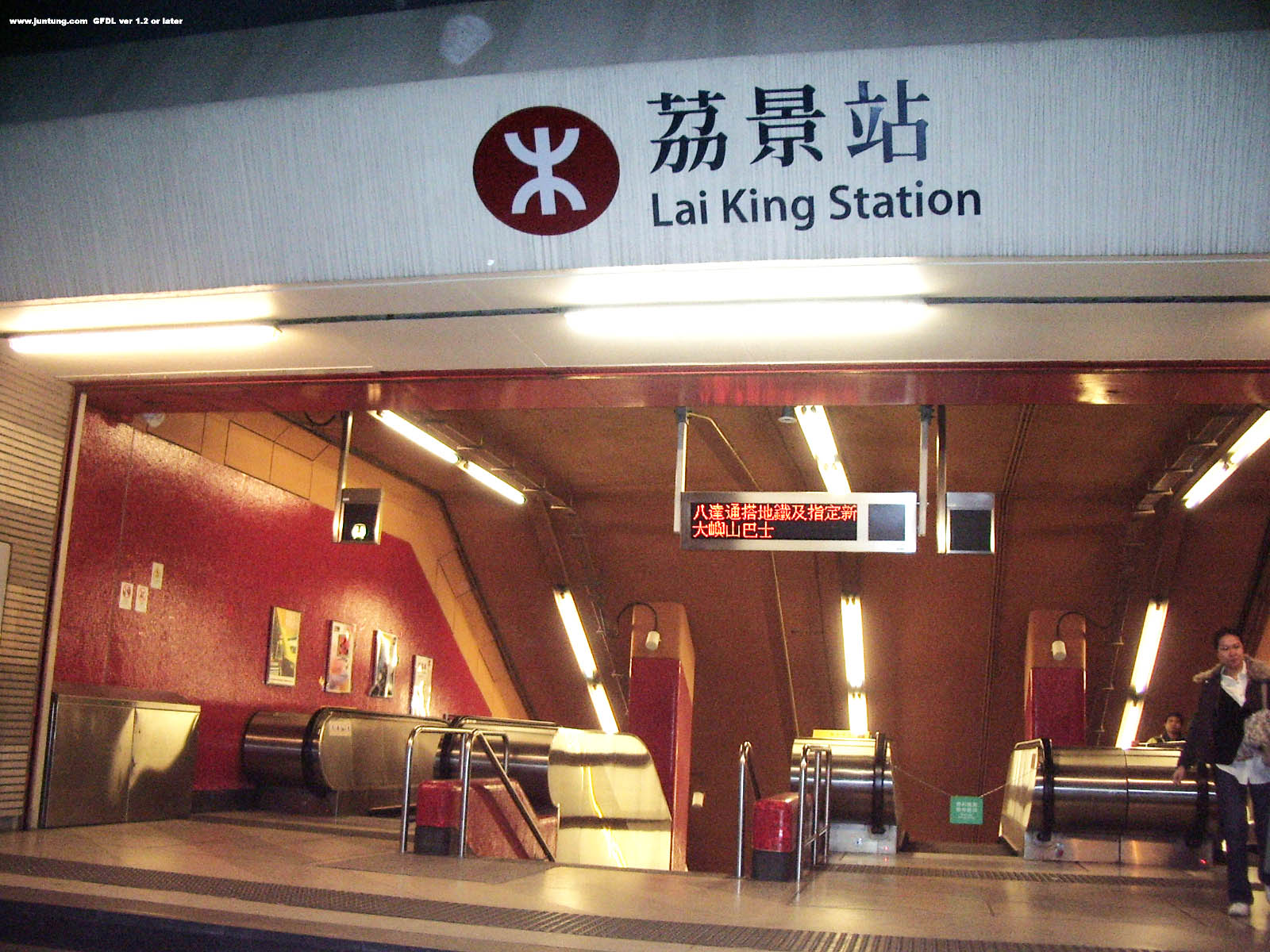
MTR Lai King station

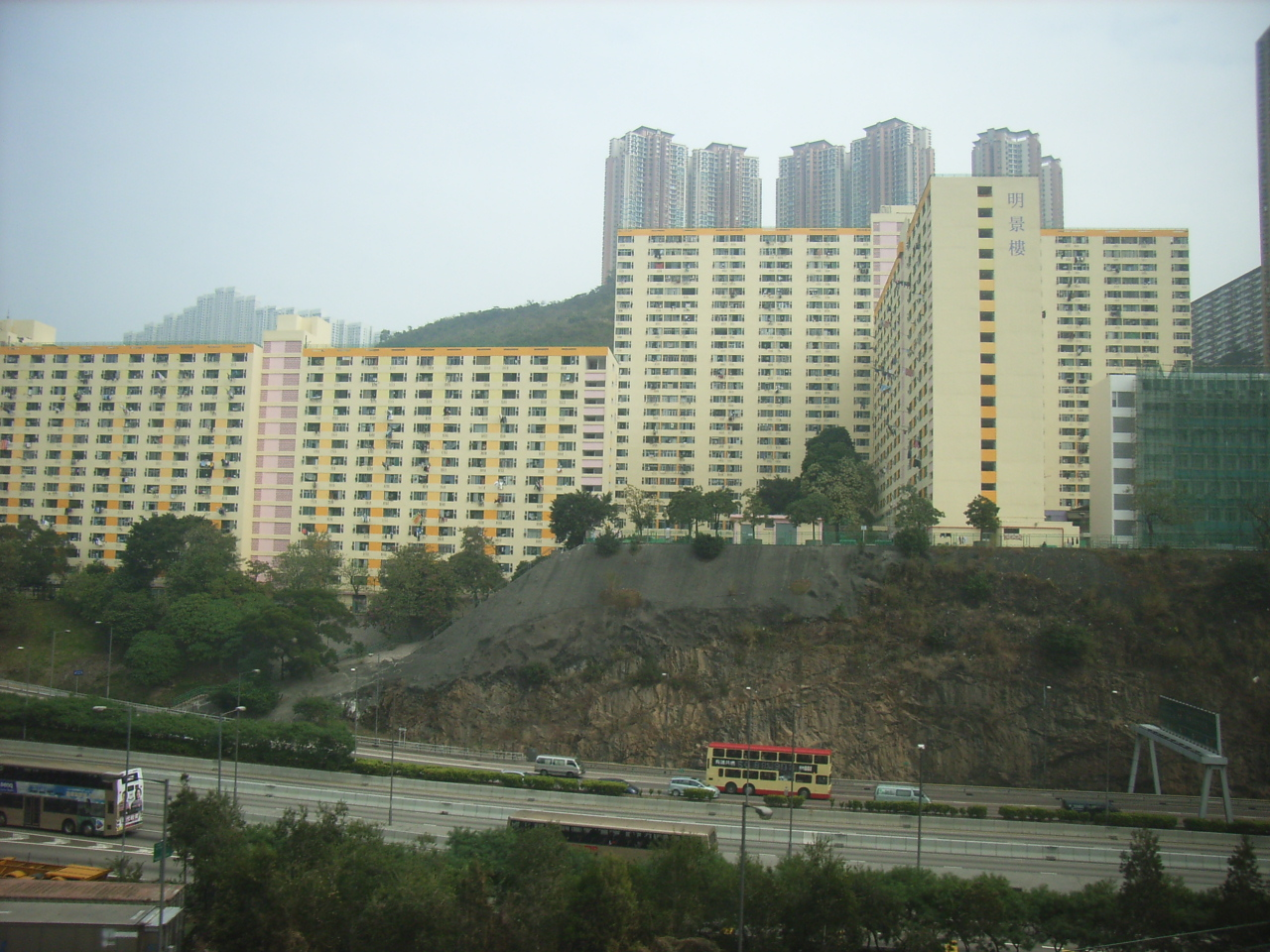
Phase 1, Lai King Estate

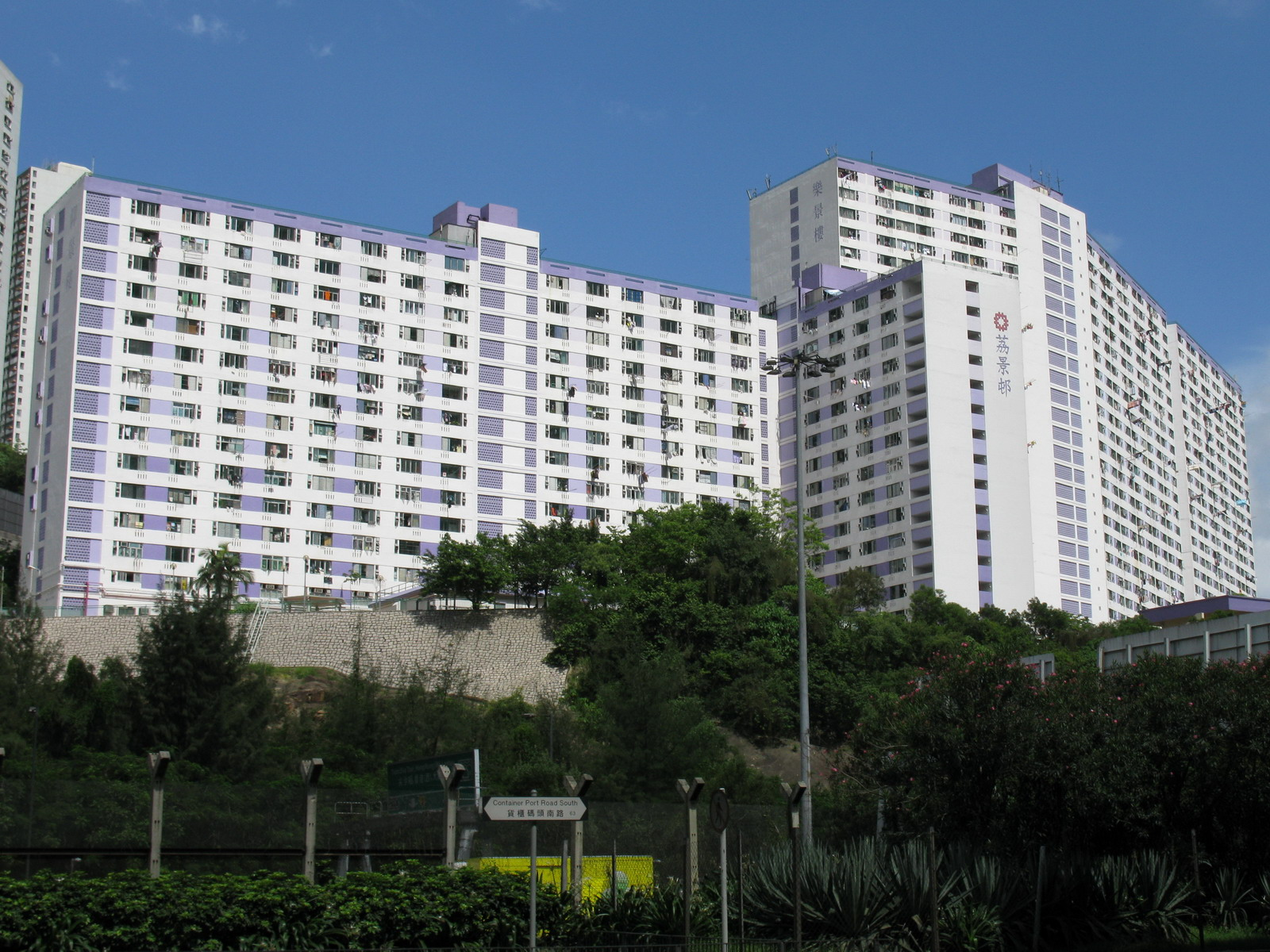
Phase 2, Lai King Estate

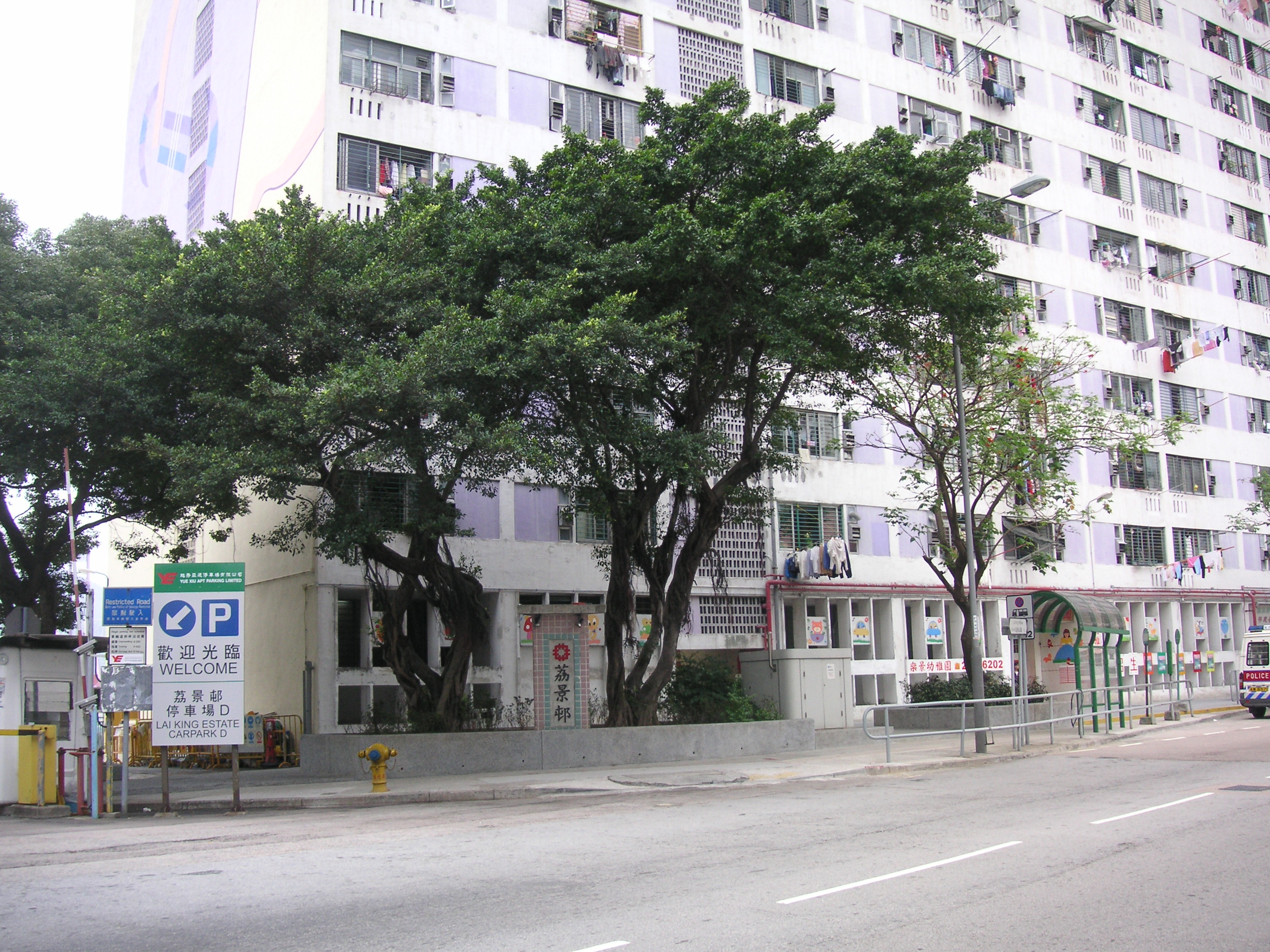
Lok King House, Lai King Estate

== Education ==
Lai King is in Primary One Admission (POA) School Net 65, which includes multiple aided schools (schools operated independently of the government but funded with government money); none of the schools in the net are government schools.

== Others ==
- Lai King Estate
- Lai King station
