= Kwai Tsing District Council =

Council for Kwai Tsing District, Hong Kong

Kwai Tsing District Council 葵青區議會

Type
- Type: Hong Kong District Council of the Kwai Tsing District

History
- Founded: 1 April 1985 (District Board); 1 July 1997 (Provisional); 1 January 2000 (District Council)

Leadership
- Chair: Huggin Tang, Independent
- Vice-Chair: Vacant

Structure
- Seats: 32 councillors consisting of 6 elected members 12 district committee members 13 appointed members 1 ex officio members
- DAB: 14 / 32
- FTU: 7 / 32
- BPA: 1 / 32
- Independent: 3 / 32

Elections
- Voting system: First past the post
- Last election: 10 December 2023

Meeting place
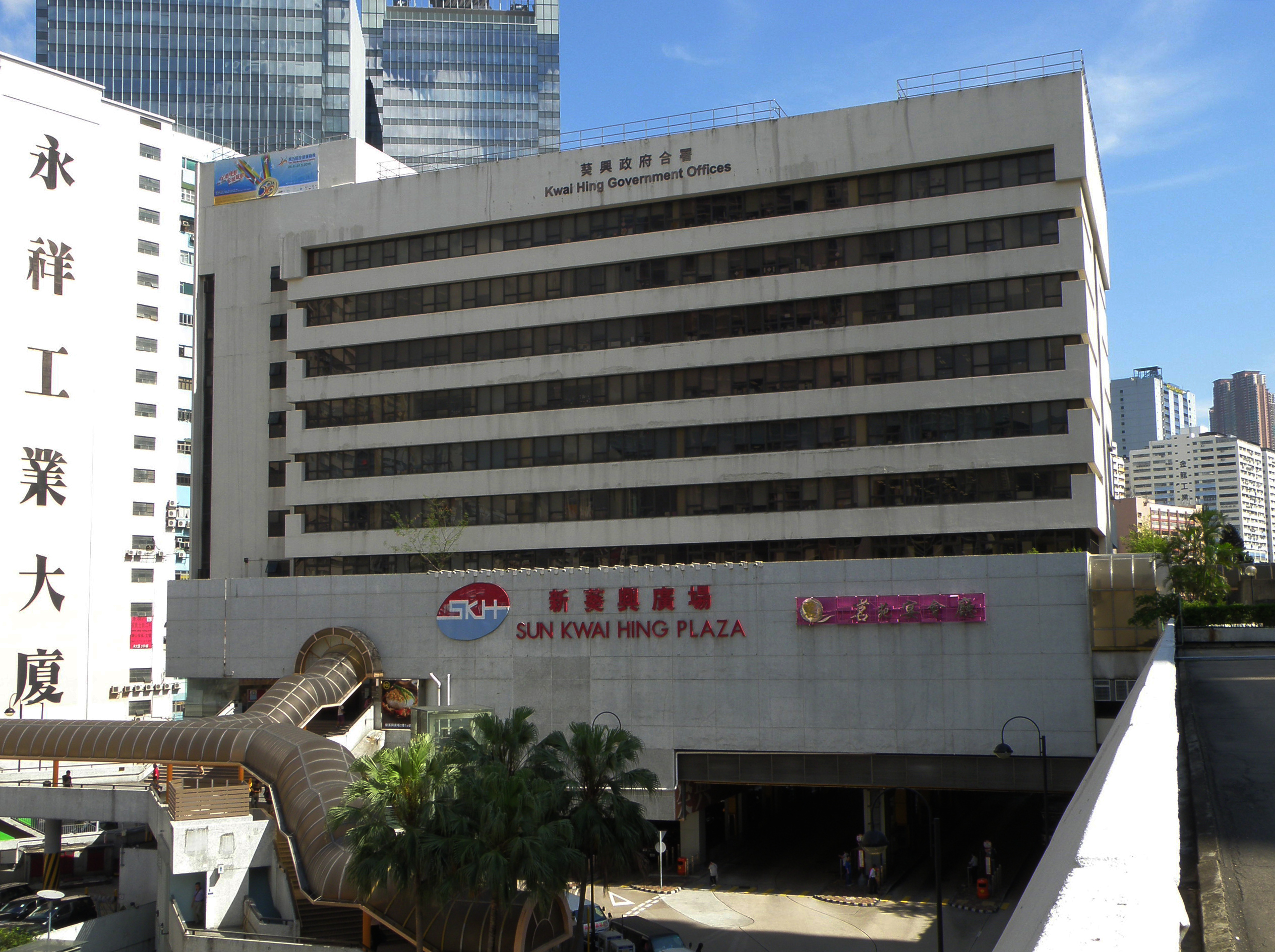
- 10/F, Kwai Hing Government Offices, 166–174 Hing Fong Road, Kwai Chung

Website
- www.districtcouncils.gov.hk/kwt/

The Kwai Tsing District Council (Chinese: 葵青區議會; noted as KWT) is the district council for the Kwai Tsing District in Hong Kong. It is one of 18 such councils. It currently consists of 32 members of which 6 are directly elected from the three constituencies of the district, 12 district committee members, 13 appointed members, and one ex-officio member who is the Tsing Yi Rural Committee chairman. The latest election was held on 10 December 2023.

== History ==
The Kwai Tsing District Council was originally part of the Tsuen Wan District Board until 1985, when a separate Kwai Chung and Tsing Yi District Board was established on 1 April 1985 due to the rapid expansion of population. It was renamed into today's Kwai Tsing District Council in 1988, making it the second youngest existing district council after Yau Tsim Mong District Council. The District Board was partly elected with the ex-officio Regional Council members and Tsing Yi Rural Committee chairman, as well as members appointed by the Governor until 1994 when last Governor Chris Patten refrained from appointing any member.

The Kwai Tsing District Board became Kwai Tsing Provisional District Board after the Hong Kong Special Administrative Region (HKSAR) was established in 1997 with the appointment system being reintroduced by Chief Executive Tung Chee-hwa. The current Kwai Tsing District Council was established on 1 January 2000 after the first District Council election in 1999. The appointed seats were abolished in 2011 after the modified constitutional reform proposal was passed by the Legislative Council in 2010.

The Kwai Tsing District Council had been a stronghold of the pro-democracy camp from 1985 until 2015. Prominent pro-democracy politicians Lee Wing-tat, Sin Chung-kai and Leung Yiu-chung were among the seven pro-democrat activists to become the first members of the council. Lee and Sin had served as council chairmen from 1988 to 1991 and from 1991 to 1994 respectively, representing the Hong Kong Association for Democracy and People's Livelihood (ADPL). The ADPL dominance was replaced by the Democratic Party when the ADPL core members joined the Democrats in the 1990s.

The Democratic Party with the Neighbourhood and Worker's Service Centre (NWSC), which had a strong presence in Shek Yam and Kwai Chung, had comfortable control of the council throughout the 1980s and the early SAR period until their influence began to eclipse in the late 2000s with the pro-Beijing camp actively absorbed the former pro-democrat independents and the Democratic Alliance for the Betterment and Progress of Hong Kong (DAB) and the Hong Kong Federation of Trade Unions (FTU) developed their bases in the district. In the 2007 election when the pan-democrats suffered a territory-wide devastating loss which saw the pro-Beijing camp gained majority of the council for the first time, with the help of the reintroduction of appointment system, where the Chief Executive would appoint pro-government councillors to set off the pro-democracy influence.

In the 2015 election, the Democrats lost its largest party status to DAB for the first time in which the Democrats' seats were down to four by losing half of their seats including the seat in Shek Yam held by its vice-chairman Andrew Wan and the DAB doubled their seats from four to eight, despite the appointment system was abolished in the election. The pro-democrats turned the tide when they scored a landslide victory in the 2019 election amid the massive pro-democracy protests and regained the control of the council by taking 27 of the 31 elected seats. Notable defeated incumbents included legislator Alice Mak of FTU in Wai Ying, while Democratic legislator Andrew Wan regained back his Shek Yam seat from his opponent from DAB.

== Political control ==
Since 1985 political control of the council has been held by the following parties:

Camp in control	Largest party	Years	Composition
Pro-government	PCPHP	1985–1988	
Pro-democracy	ADPL → United Democrats	1988–1991	
Pro-democracy	United Democrats	1991–1994	
Pro-democracy	Democratic	1994–1997	
Pro-democracy	Democratic	1997–1999	
Pro-democracy	Democratic	2000–2003	
Pro-democracy	Democratic	2004–2007	
Pro-Beijing	Democratic	2008–2011	
Pro-Beijing	Democratic	2012–2015	
Pro-Beijing	DAB	2016–2019	
Pro-democracy → Pro-Beijing	Democratic → DAB	2020–2023	
Pro-Beijing	DAB	2024–2027	

== Political makeup ==

Elections are held every four years.

Political party	Council members							Current members
Political party	1994	1999	2003	2007	2011	2015	2019	Current members
Democratic	9	10	11	9	9	4	12	11 / 32
Independent	9	13	9	8	8	4	9	12 / 32
DAB	0	2	1	4	5	8	3	3 / 32
NWSC	1	2	4	4	5	5	3	2 / 32
Roundtable	-	-	-	-	-	-	1	1 / 32
TYP	-	-	-	-	-	-	1	1 / 32

== District result maps ==
1994

1999

2003

2007

2011

2015

2019

== Members represented ==
Capacity	Code	Constituency	Name	Political affiliation	Term		Notes
Elected	S01	Tsing Yi	Lo Yuen-ting	DAB	1 January 2024	Incumbent	
Elected	S01	Tsing Yi	Pang Yap-ming	FTU	1 January 2024	Incumbent	
Elected	S02	Kwai Tsing East	Jody Kwok Fu-yung	DAB	1 January 2024	Incumbent	
Elected	S02	Kwai Tsing East	Chau Kit-ying	FTU	1 January 2024	Incumbent	
Elected	S03	Kwai Tsing West	Chan On-ni	FTU	1 January 2024	Incumbent	
Elected	S03	Kwai Tsing West	Wong Chun-yeung	DAB	1 January 2024	Incumbent	
District Committees			Ng Kin-wah	DAB	1 January 2024	Incumbent	
District Committees			Tang Lai-ling	DAB	1 January 2024	Incumbent	
District Committees			Lam Ying-wai	DAB	1 January 2024	Incumbent	
District Committees			Yuen Yun-hung	DAB	1 January 2024	Incumbent	
District Committees			Wong Shuk-man	DAB	1 January 2024	Incumbent	
District Committees			Benny Ng Yam-fung	DAB	1 January 2024	Incumbent	
District Committees			Ng Chi-wah	DAB	1 January 2024	Incumbent	
District Committees			Wong Siu-kwan	DAB	1 January 2024	Incumbent	
District Committees			Lee Wai-lok	FTU	1 January 2024	Incumbent	
District Committees			Ariel Mok Yee-ki	BPA	1 January 2024	Incumbent	
District Committees			James Lau Hing-wah	Independent	1 January 2024	Incumbent	
District Committees			Guo Huimin	Independent	1 January 2024	Incumbent	
Appointed			Chu Lai-ling	DAB	1 January 2024	Incumbent	
Appointed			Leung Kar-ming	DAB	1 January 2024	Incumbent	
Appointed			Poon Chi-sing	DAB	1 January 2024	Incumbent	
Appointed			Lau Mei-lo	FTU	1 January 2024	Incumbent	
Appointed			Au Chi-fai	FTU	1 January 2024	Incumbent	
Appointed			So Pak-tsan	FTU	1 January 2024	Incumbent	
Appointed			Wang Chung-wing	Independent	1 January 2024	Incumbent	
Appointed			Chow Kim-ho	Independent	1 January 2024	Incumbent	
Appointed			Lam Chui-ling	Independent	1 January 2024	Incumbent	
Appointed			Jonathan Tsui Hui-kit	Independent	1 January 2024	Incumbent	
Appointed			Chan Oi-yi	Independent	1 January 2024	Incumbent	
Appointed			Yip Cheung-chun	Independent	1 January 2024	Incumbent	
Appointed			Cheng Lam	Independent	1 January 2024	Incumbent	
Ex Officio		Tsing Yi Rural Committee Chairman	Chan Chi-wing	Independent	1 January 2024	Incumbent	

== Leadership ==
=== Chairs ===
Since 1985, the chairman is elected by all the members of the board:

Chairman	Years	Political Affiliation
John Ho Tung-ching	1985–1988	Nonpartisan
Lee Wing-tat	1988–1991	ADPL→United Democrat
Leung Kwong-cheong	1991–1994	ADPL→Democratic
Sin Chung-kai	1994–1999	Democratic
Chow Yick-hay	2000–2007	Democratic
Tang Kwok-kong	2008–2011	Heung Yee Kuk
Fong Ping	2011–2015	Independent→BPA
Law King-shing	2016–2019	DAB
Sin Chung-kai	2020–2021	Democratic
Leung Kam-wai	2021–2023	Independent
Huggin Tang	2024–present	Nonpartisan

=== Vice Chairs ===
Vice Chairman	Years	Political Affiliation
Edinson So Hoi-pan	2000–2003	Liberal
Leung Wing-keun	2004–2007	NWSC
Alice Mak Mei-kuen	2008–2011	FTU
Law King-shing	2012–2015	DAB
Chow Yick-hay	2016–2019	Independent
Cheung Man-lung	2020–2021	Independent
