= Kwai Chung =

Urban area in the New Territories of Hong Kong

Coordinates: 22°22′0″N 114°7′30″E

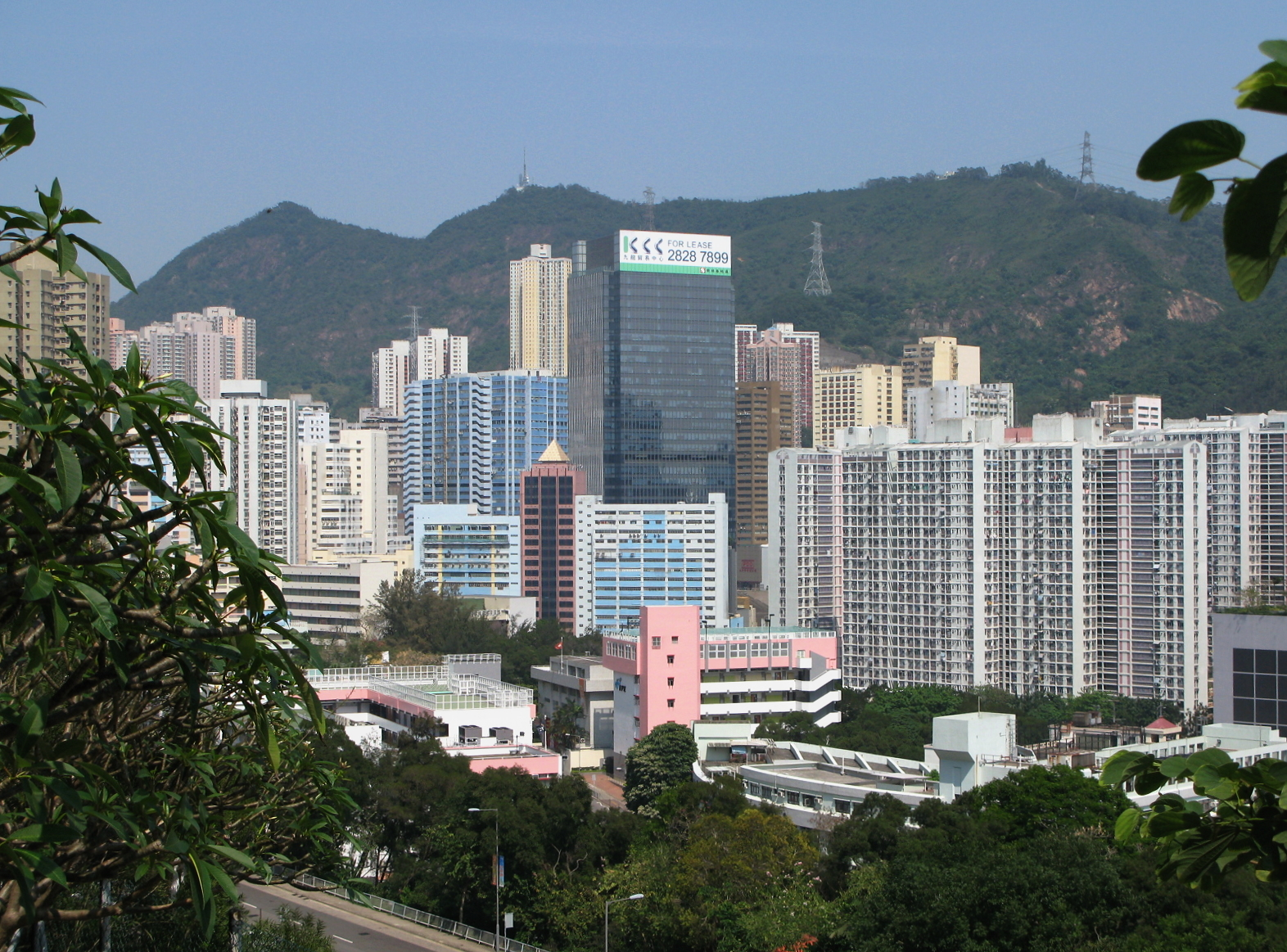
- Kwai Chung skyline in 2010
- Chinese: 葵涌
Transcriptions
Standard Mandarin
- Hanyu Pinyin: Kuíchōng
- Wade–Giles: Kʻui'chʻong
Hakka
- Romanization: kwi^{2} cung^{1}
Yue: Cantonese
- Jyutping: kwai4 cung1
- IPA: [kʷʰɐ̏i tsʰʊ́ŋ]

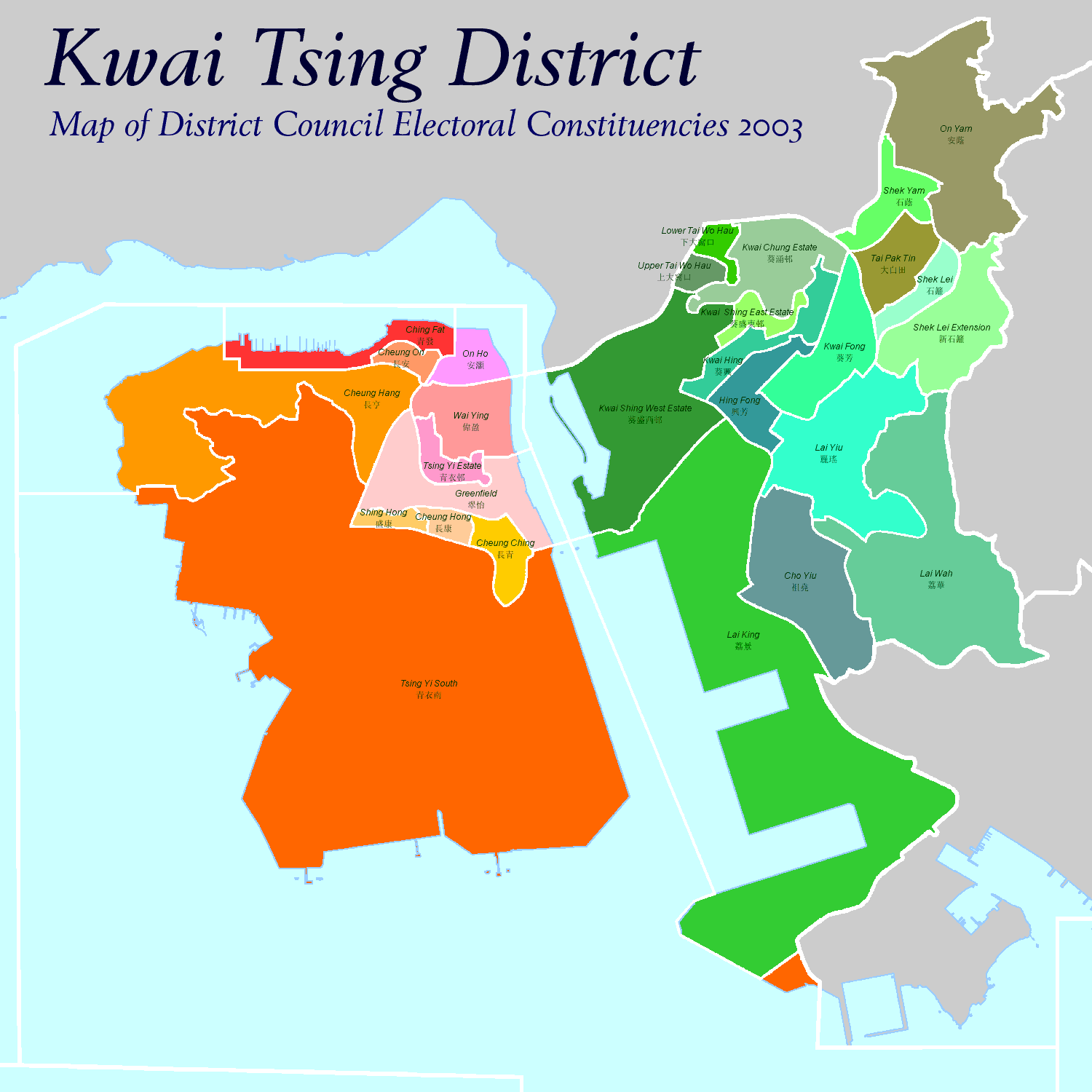
Constituencies in 2003 District Council Election. Kwai Chung is the region on the right.

Kwai Chung is an urban area within Tsuen Wan New Town in the New Territories of Hong Kong. Together with Tsing Yi Island, it is part of the Kwai Tsing District of Hong Kong. It is also part of Tsuen Wan New Town.

In 2000, it had a population of 287,000. Its area is 9.93 km^{2}. Areas within Kwai Chung include: Kwai Fong, Kwai Hing, Lai King, Tai Wo Hau. Kwai Chung is the site of part of the container port of Hong Kong.

== Origin of the name ==
In earlier times Kwai Chung was called Kwai Chung Tsai (葵涌子). Kwai Chung was a stream (Chung) that emptied into Gin Drinkers Bay (醉酒灣). The whole bay was reclaimed for land and the stream is no longer visible.

== Divisions ==
Traditionally, Kwai Chung is divided into Sheung Kwai Chung (上葵涌; 'Upper Kwai Chung'), and Ha Kwai Chung (下葵涌; 'Lower Kwai Chung'). Administratively, the former is called North Kwai Chung, and the latter South Kwai Chung.

Sheung Kwai Chung, Chung Kwai Chung Village (中葵涌村) and Ha Kwai Chung Village (下葵涌村) are recognized villages under the New Territories Small House Policy.

== Economy ==
Kwai Chung is the home of the principal commercial cargo handling area of Hong Kong, the Kwai Chung Container Terminal, one of the largest and busiest port facilities in the world. The main commercial port was relocated here from Yau Ma Tei in the 1980s, in preparation for the West Kowloon Reclamation, which has left the original waterfront of Yau Ma Tei almost half a mile inland.

The area has the head office of Kerry Logistics.

== Education ==
- Lutheran School for the Deaf is in Kwai Chung.
- S.T.F.A. Lee Shau Kee College

Sheung Kwai Chung and Chung Kwai Chung (Upper and Central Kwai Chung) are in Primary One Admission (POA) School Net 64, which includes multiple aided schools (schools operated independently of the government but funded with government money); none of the schools in the net are government schools.

Ha Kwai Chung (Lower Kwai Chung) is in Primary One Admission (POA) School Net 65, which includes multiple aided schools; none of the schools in the net are government schools.

Hong Kong Public Libraries maintains the North Kwai Chung Public Library in the North Kwai Chung Market & Library facility, as well as the South Kwai Chung Public Library in the Kwai Hing Government Offices.

== See also ==
- List of places in Hong Kong
- Public housing estates in Kwai Chung
- Hulu Concept, a not-for-profit cultural organisation based in Kwai Chung
