= List of hotels in Portland, Oregon =

This is a list of hotels in Portland, Oregon, both current and former.

== Current ==
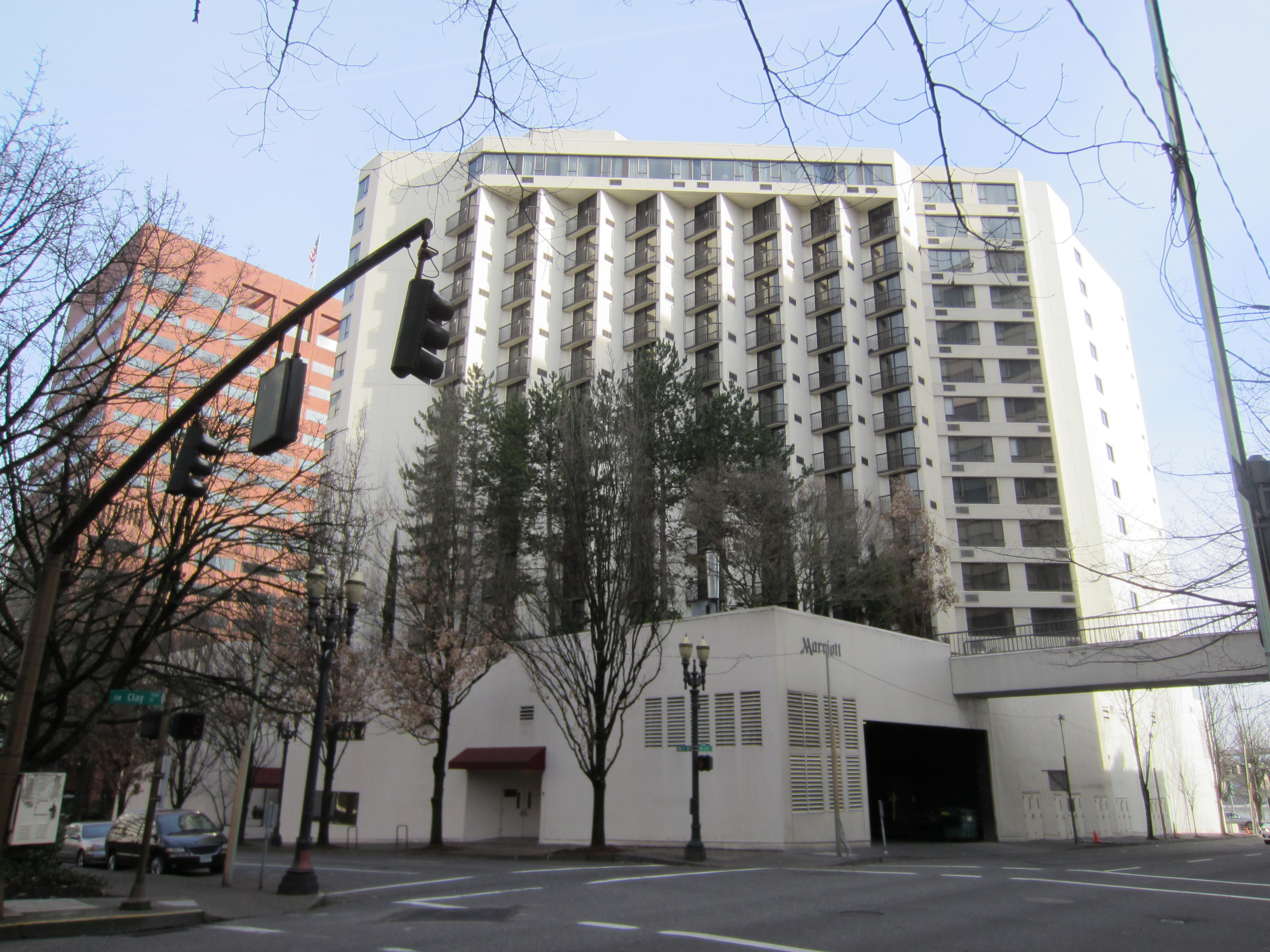
The Bidwell Marriott Portland

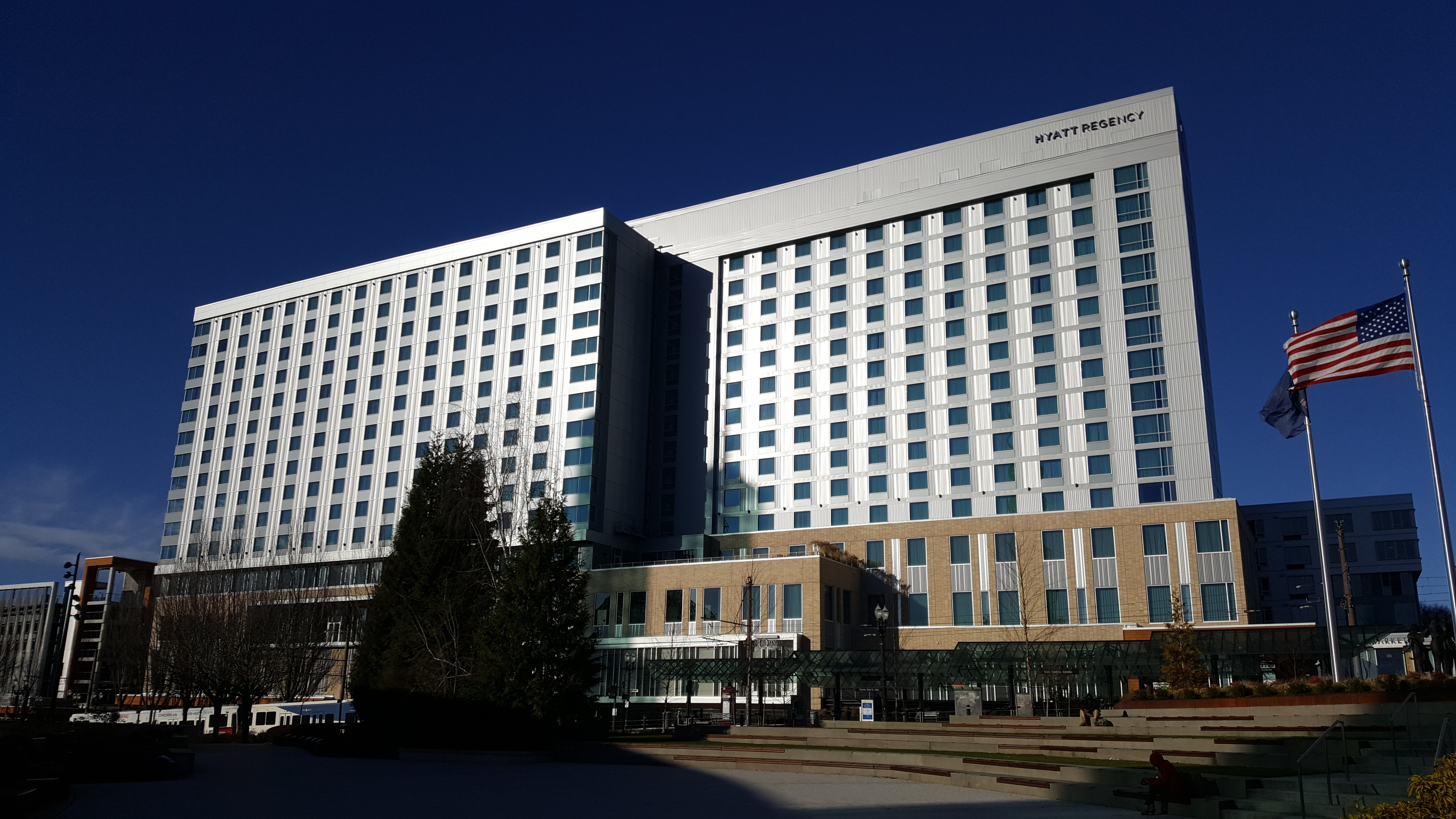
Hyatt Regency Portland

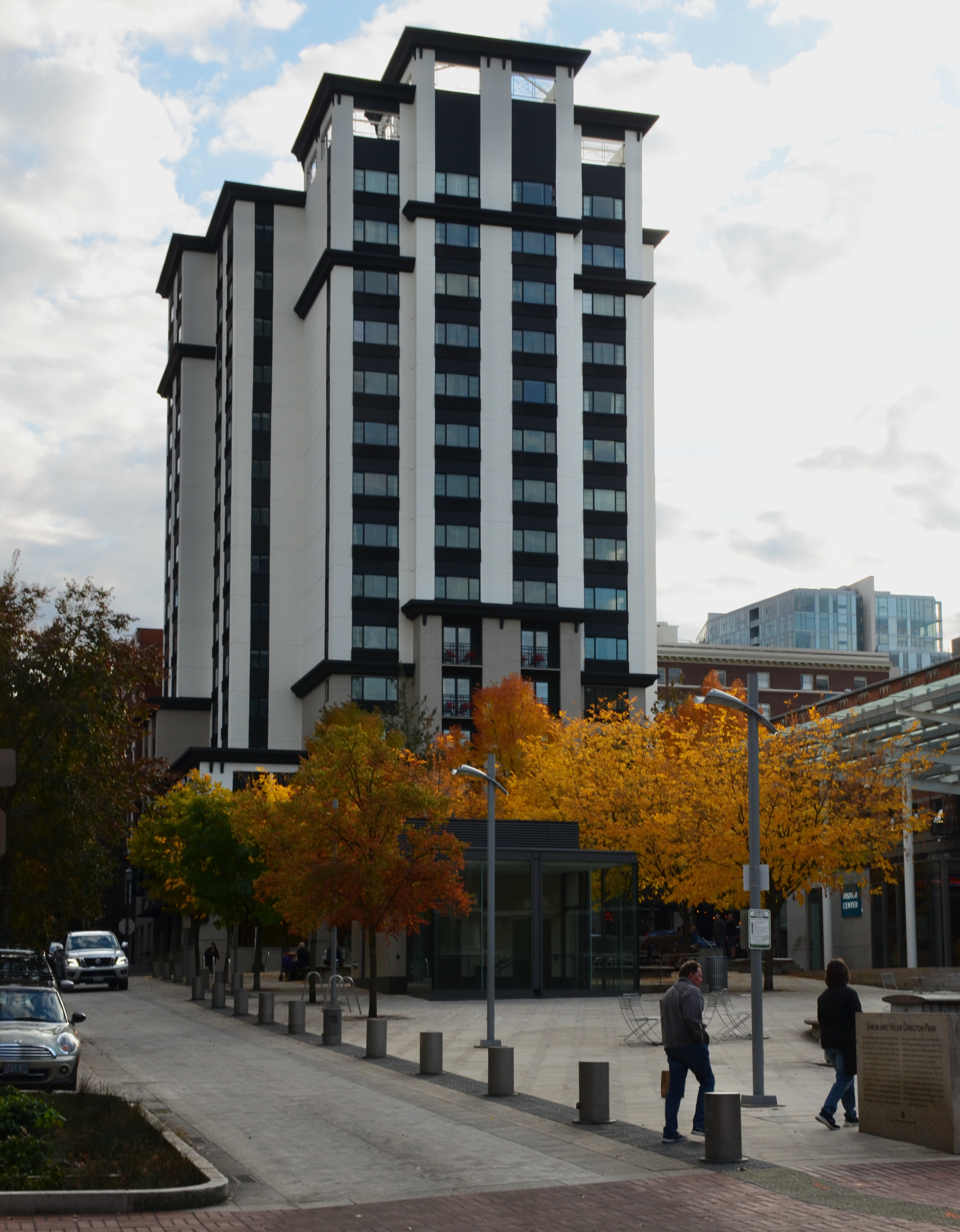
Paramount Hotel

- AC Hotel Portland Downtown
- Benson Hotel
- The Bidwell Marriott Portland
- Canopy by Hilton Portland Pearl District
- Cascada
- Crystal Hotel
- DoubleTree by Hilton Hotel Portland
- Heathman Hotel
- Hilton Portland Hotel
- Holiday Inn Portland-Columbia Riverfront
- Hotel deLuxe
- Hotel Eastlund
- Hotel Grand Stark
- Hotel Rose
- Hotel Vance, Portland, a Tribute Portfolio Hotel
- The Hoxton, Portland
- Hyatt Centric Downtown Portland
- Hyatt Regency Portland
- Imperial Hotel
- Jupiter Hotel
- Kennedy School
- Kenton Hotel
- KEX Hotel
- Hotel Lucia
- The Mark Spencer Hotel
- Moxy
- Multnomah Hotel
- The Nines
- Paramount Hotel
- Porter Portland
- Portland Marriott Downtown Waterfront
- Ritz-Carlton, Portland
- RiverPlace Hotel
- Sentinel Hotel
- Seward Hotel
- Society Hotel

== Former ==
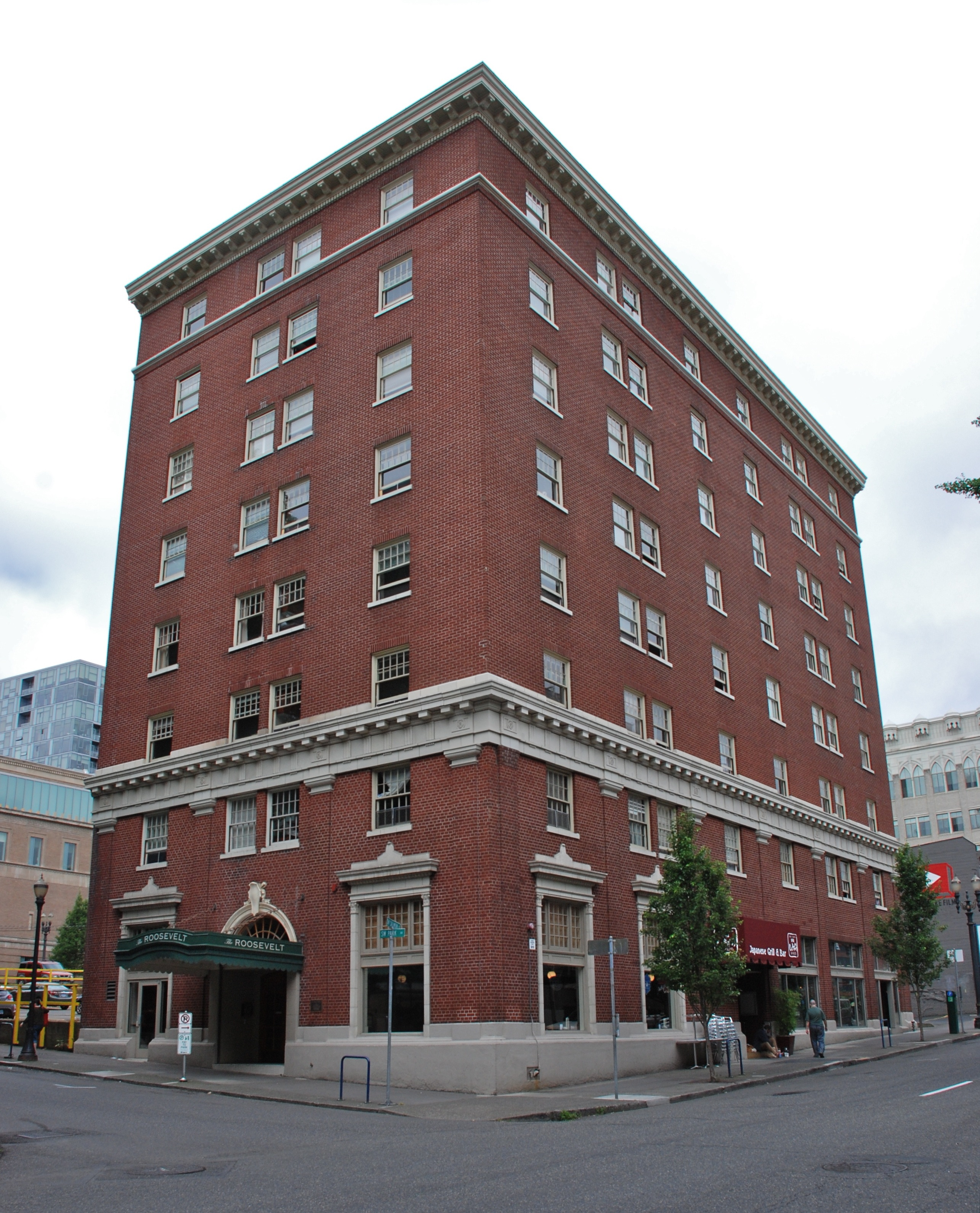
Roosevelt Hotel

- Arminius Hotel
- Broadway Hotel
- Calumet Hotel
- Campbell Court Hotel
- Campbell Hotel
- Clyde Hotel
- Commodore Hotel
- Congress Hotel
- Cornelius Hotel
- Elks Temple
- Fairmount Hotel
- Hamilton Hotel
- Hill Hotel
- Hotel Albion
- Hotel Alder
- Hotel Ramapo
- Hoyt Hotel
- Merchant Hotel
- Osborn Hotel
- Park Heathman Hotel
- Portland Hotel
- Roosevelt Hotel
- Sovereign Hotel
- Trinity Place Apartments
