= DoubleTree =

American hotel chain managed by Hilton

DoubleTree by Hilton
- Type: Subsidiary
- Industry: Hotel Franchising
- Founded: January 1969; 57 years ago in Scottsdale, Arizona, United States
- Founder: Samuel F. Kitchell
- Headquarters: McLean, Virginia, United States
- Number of locations: 587 (December 31, 2019)
- Area served: Worldwide
- Parent: Hilton Worldwide
- Website: doubletree.com

DoubleTree by Hilton is an American hotel chain managed by Hilton Worldwide. DoubleTree has been the fastest growing Hilton brand by number of properties since 2007, and by number of rooms from 2007 to 2015. As of December 2019, it has 587 properties with 135,745 rooms in 47 countries and territories, including 122 that are managed with 35,122 rooms and 465 that are franchised with 100,623 rooms.

DoubleTree competes in the full service category, alongside sister chain Hilton Hotels & Resorts. DoubleTree is notable for its signature chocolate chip cookies, which were originally made in the early 1980s for VIPs but now given to all guests and made by Nashville-based Christie Cookie Company for over 30 years. In 2020, during the COVID-19 pandemic, the brand published a home-adapted recipe for their cookies.

== History ==
The first Doubletree Inn opened in Scottsdale, Arizona, in 1969. It was located on the grounds of Scottsdale Fashion Square and was built by Sam Kitchell. The Doubletree Hotels Corporation merged with the Guest Quarters Hotels Partnership of Boston in December 1993. The acquired all-suite hotels were rebranded as Doubletree Guest Suites hotels. The Doubletree Corporation later merged with the Promus Hotel Corporation in December 1997, bringing together the Doubletree, Red Lion, Hampton Inn, and Embassy Suites brands. In December 1999, Hilton Hotels Corporation acquired Promus Hotel Corporation, which brought Doubletree Hotels and other Promus hotel brands under the umbrella of the newly renamed Hilton Worldwide. In October 2010, Hilton Worldwide launched a logo and name rebranding for the chain, replacing the name "Doubletree" with "DoubleTree by Hilton".

DoubleTree's strategy to grow the brand has been to convince operators of other brands to switch flags. This is in contrast to brands like Marriott or Sheraton, prior to its acquisition, which rely on new construction to grow their footprint. DoubleTree also provides lower cost options to improve properties, which help operators remain in the brand system.

On November 2, 2019, DoubleTree Cookie became the first cookie baked in space as ISS Commander Luca Parmitano of the European Space Agency baked the brand's cookie dough inside the prototype oven.

On October 31, 2024, workers at the San Jose-based Doubletree, which underwent a three day strike in September 2024, were able to get new labor contracts. From October to November 2024, workers at Doubletree's Seattle area Seatac and Boston-Cambridge locations would successfully wage strikes.

== Accommodations ==
		U.S.	Americas (excl. US)	Europe	Middle E. & Africa	Asia Pacific	Total
2013	Properties	277	14	45	7	28	371
2013	Rooms	70,989	2,700	8,997	1,273	9,095	93,054
2014	Properties	292	16	54	11	37	410
2014	Rooms	73,898	3,058	11,009	1,952	10,962	100,879
2015	Properties	313	21	67	13	43	457
2015	Rooms	78,388	4,068	13,121	2,362	12,833	110,772
2016	Properties	326	22	86	13	47	494
2016	Rooms	81,073	4,400	15,860	2,602	13,764	117,699
2017	Properties	338	25	92	14	51	520
2017	Rooms	83,691	5,160	16,899	2,838	15,185	123,773
2018	Properties	351	27	105	16	60	559
2018	Rooms	85,739	5,725	19,313	3,068	16,869	130,714
2019	Properties	360	33	110	18	66	587
2019	Rooms	87,071	6,498	19,783	3,882	18,511	135,745
2020	Properties	371	39	115	19	72	616
2020	Rooms	88,691	7,634	20,982	4,421	19,636	141,364
2021	Properties	373	37	122	22	81	635
2021	Rooms	88,355	7,332	22,027	5,167	22,020	144,901
2022	Properties	379	42	123	25	91	660
2022	Rooms	89,519	8,409	22,190	5,764	24,275	150,157
2023	Properties	385	41	126	25	100	677
2023	Rooms	90,311	8,282	23,372	6,343	26,400	154,708

== Notable properties ==
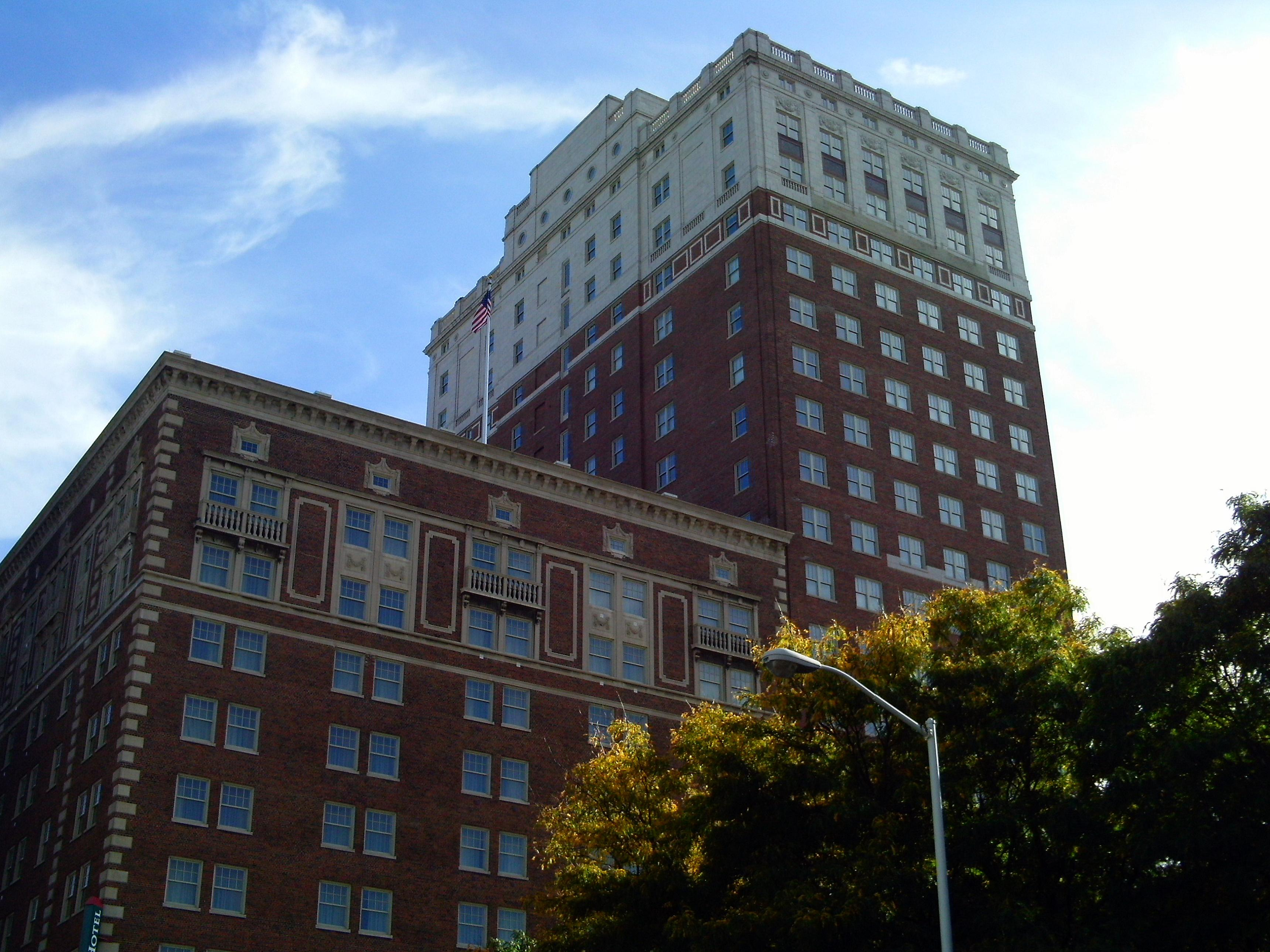
DoubleTree by Hilton in Detroit, United States

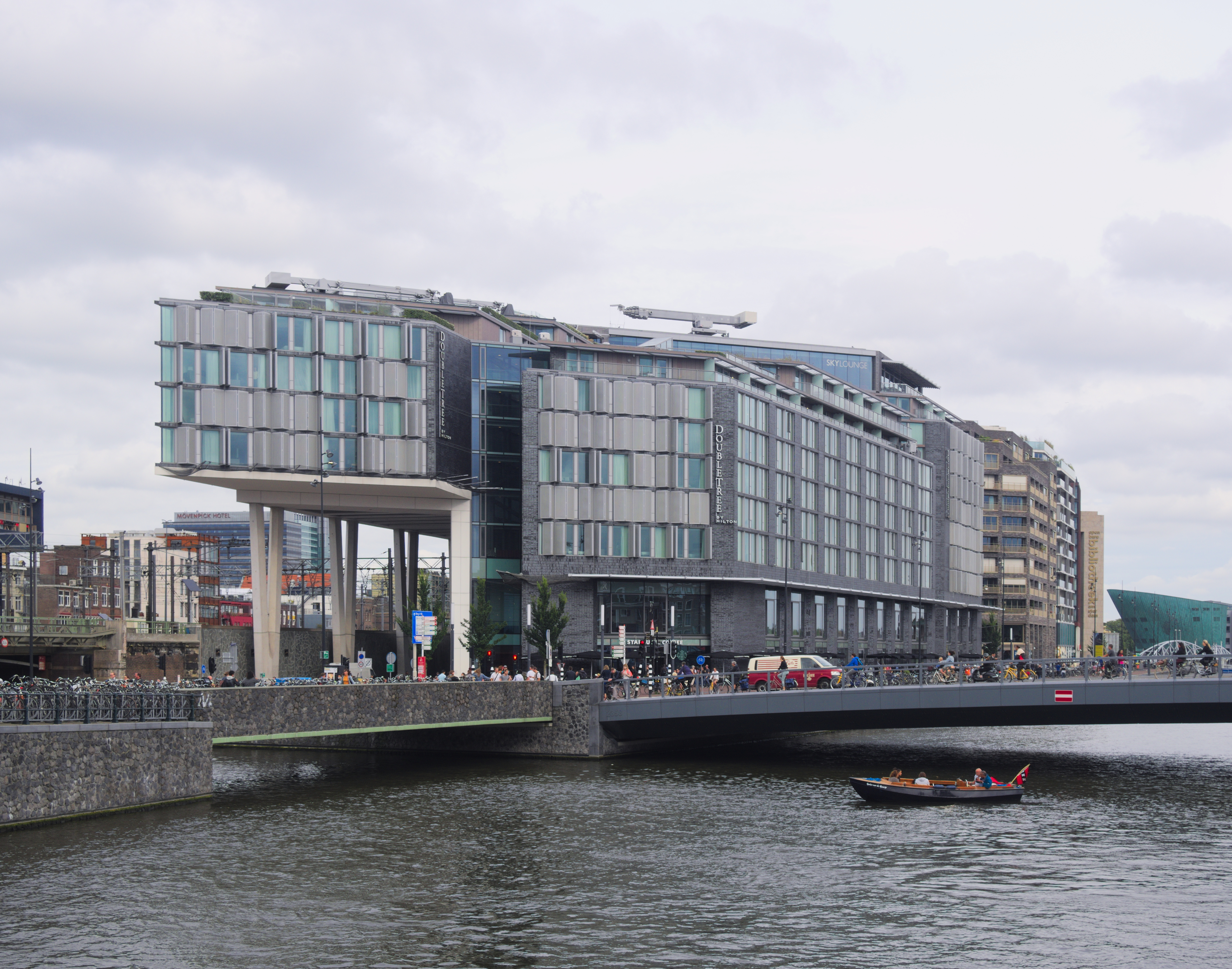
DoubleTree by Hilton in Amsterdam, Netherlands

- Billings, United States: The DoubleTree by Hilton Hotel Billings is the second-tallest building in the northern Rocky Mountains region. It is made entirely of bricks in an applied masonry facade. The hotel was formerly affiliated with Sheraton and Crowne Plaza prior to its DoubleTree rebranding in 2016.
- Boston, United States: The DoubleTree by Hilton Hotel Boston - Downtown is housed within the former Don Bosco Technical High School, a Catholic school for immigrant boys.
- Brighton, United Kingdom: The DoubleTree by Hilton Brighton Metropole was built in 1890 by Alfred Waterhouse, who also designed the University College London. Hilton assumed management of the property in 2000 and originally designated it as a Hilton, before rebranding it as a DoubleTree in 2023.
- Chapel Hill, United States: The Carolina Inn, located within the campus of University of North Carolina at Chapel Hill, was managed by DoubleTree between 1993 and 2007.
- Cheltenham, United Kingdom: The DoubleTree by Hilton Cheltenham occupies a Regency era building called Lilleybrook. Originally a private manor, it was converted to a hotel in 1922.
- Denver, United States: The Curtis, a skyscraper in Downtown Denver, has been affiliated with DoubleTree since 2010. Aside from hotel, the building also houses dormitories of the Auraria Campus.
- Detroit, United States: The Neoclassical-style Fort Shelby Hotel in Downtown Detroit became a DoubleTree Suites property on December 15, 2008.
- Dublin, Ireland: The Burlington Hotel was managed by DoubleTree between 2013 and 2016.
- Harrogate, United Kingdom: Hilton assumed management of the historic Majestic Hotel as a DoubleTree property in 2019. The hotel first opened in 1900, and was designed by George Dennis Martin.
- Hilo, United States: The Grand Naniloa Hotel is the oldest hotel on Hawaii island. After a $30 million renovation, it was rebranded a DoubleTree in 2016.
- Las Vegas, United States: The Tropicana Las Vegas casino hotel borders the Tropicana – Las Vegas Boulevard intersection, which has the most number of hotel rooms of any intersection in the world. The hotel has been affiliated with DoubleTree since 2012.
- London, United Kingdom: The 100 Queen's Gate Hotel London was operated as DoubleTree by Hilton Hotel London - Kensington from 2015 to 2019, when it was moved to the Curio Collection. The building dates back to 1870, as the home of a Victorian era aristocrat.
- Los Angeles, United States: The DoubleTree by Hilton Hotel Los Angeles Downtown is located in Little Tokyo, and was developed by Kajima. Opened in 1977 as part of New Otani Hotels, Hilton took over the management in 2012 as a DoubleTree, following renovations.
- Miami, United States: The DoubleTree by Hilton Grand Hotel Biscayne Bay, also known as The Grand DoubleTree, has the Sea Isle Marina as its backyard, which hosts the annual Miami International Boat Show.
- Miami Beach, United States: The Surfcomber Hotel, a historic Art Deco building in Miami Beach, was operated by DoubleTree prior to 2011, when it was acquired by Kimpton and turned into a luxury hotel.
- Naha, Japan: Called DoubleTree by Hilton Naha Shuri Castle, it is located close to Shuri Castle.

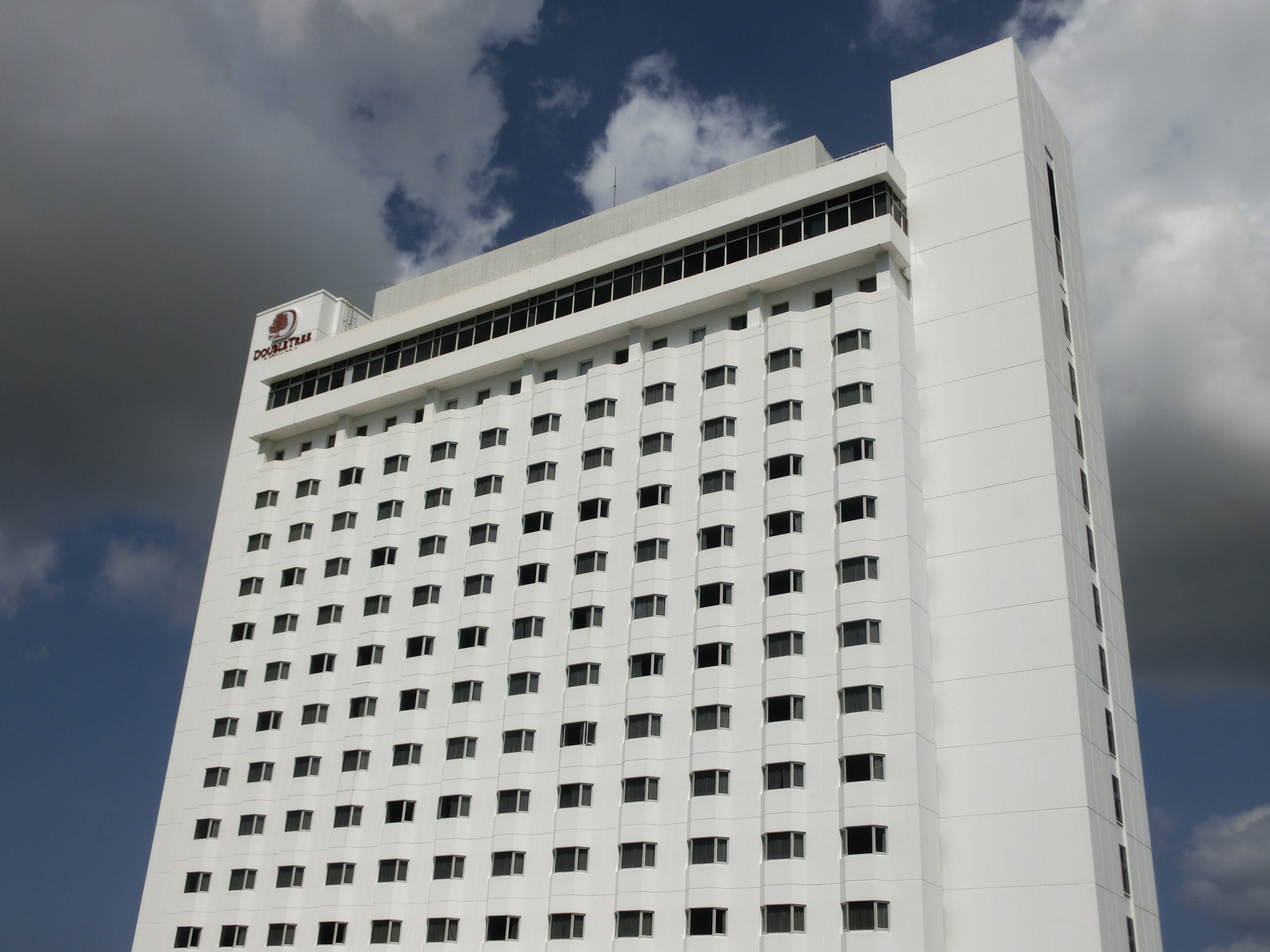
DoubleTree by Hilton Naha Shuri Castle in Naha, Japan

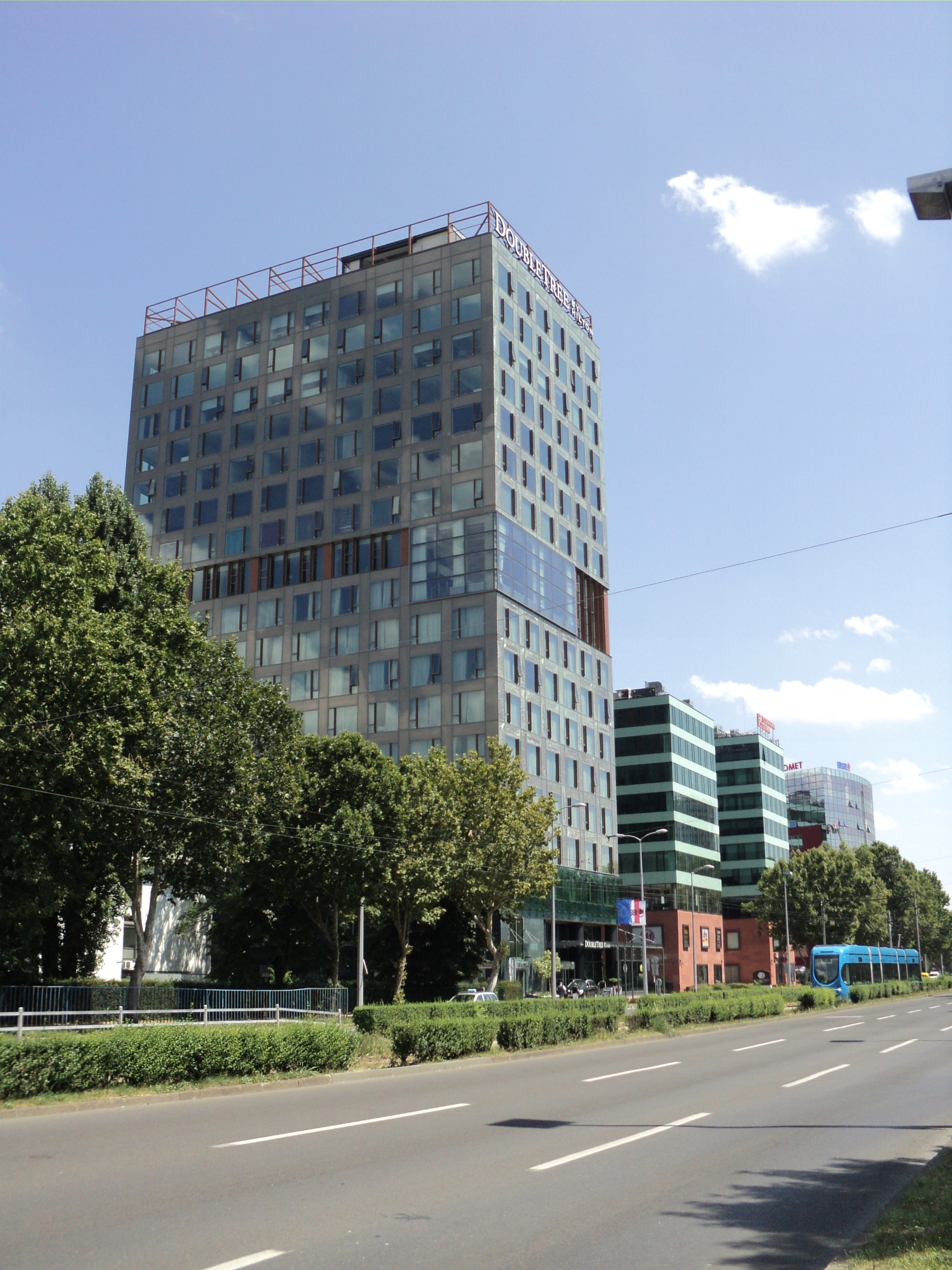
DoubleTree by Hilton in Zagreb, Croatia

- New York City, United States:
  - The original Palace Theatre at Broadway was partly demolished to make way for a DoubleTree Suites hotel (originally branded an Embassy Suites), which opened in 1991. The theater reopened inside the DoubleTree building. In 2019, the hotel closed and was demolished, with plans to rebuild it into a 46-storey mixed-use skyscraper called TSX Broadway, which contains a Tempo by Hilton hotel.
  - The DoubleTree by Hilton Hotel Metropolitan New York City is designated a New York City landmark. Originally a Loews theater, the hotel first opened in 1961, and was Manhattan's first new short-term accommodation in thirty years. It was rebranded a DoubleTree in 2005. The hotel closed in 2020 as a result of the COVID-19 pandemic.
- Pittsburgh, United States: The Westin Convention Center Pittsburgh, located near the David L. Lawrence Convention Center, opened as a Vista Hotel, a Hilton International brand for properties it operated in the United States, before DoubleTree took over between 1995 and 2001. It later changed hands to Starwood and was turned into a Westin.
- Portland, United States:
  - The DoubleTree by Hilton Hotel Portland first opened as a Sheraton in 1959. It is one of the largest hotels in Portland, and, during the 1980s, was the largest in all of Oregon.
  - The Holiday Inn Portland-Columbia Riverfront was opened as a DoubleTree in 1978, before it was sold away in the 1990s. It is located on Hayden Island.
- Roanoke, United States: Hotel Roanoke, which dates back to 1882, is owned by Virginia Tech. DoubleTree managed the hotel from 1995 to 2016, when it was transferred to the Curio Collection.
- Seattle, entitled DoubleTree by Hilton Hotel Seattle Airport. This hotel is located off Route 99 adjacent to the Seattle–Tacoma International Airport.
- San Antonio, United States: The Emily Morgan Hotel is located across the street from the Alamo. It is designated a member of the Historic Hotels of America.
- Santa Monica: The Hilton Santa Monica Hotel & Suites was formerly a DoubleTree Suites prior to a 2021 renovation which rebranded it into a Hilton.
- Tucson, AZ: The DoubleTree by Hilton Tucson Reid Park was built in 1976 and is the longest continuously operating DoubleTree property in the United States. The Tucson Reid Park location has operated exclusively as a DoubleTree, and even operated as a DoubleTree Resort into the mid 1980’s.
- Springfield, United States: The President Abraham Lincoln Hotel opened in 1985 as a Ramada Renaissance. DoubleTree assumed management in 2013. The hotel is connected to the Bank of Springfield Center by a tunnel.
- Stoke-on-Trent, United Kingdom: The Etruria Hall, a Grade II listed house and former home of Josiah Wedgwood, formed part of a hotel complex which was taken over by Hilton as DoubleTree by Hilton Stoke-on-Trent in 2020.
- Sharjah, United Arab Emirates: Initial construction started in 2014, completed and opened in 2021 costing 232,300,000 AED. the hotel has a capacity of having 254 guests and cater over 65,000 diners. It oversee the Majaz waterfront and park.
- Utica, United States: The historic Hotel Utica, which dates back to 1912, was renovated and reopened as DoubleTree by Hilton Utica on October 24, 2017.
- Zagreb, Croatia: Located in downtown of Zagreb's core in a Green Gold business complex. It's one of 3 Hilton properties in Zagreb.
