= Benson Hotel =

Historic hotel in Portland, Oregon, U.S.

- U.S. National Register of Historic Places
- Portland Historic Landmark
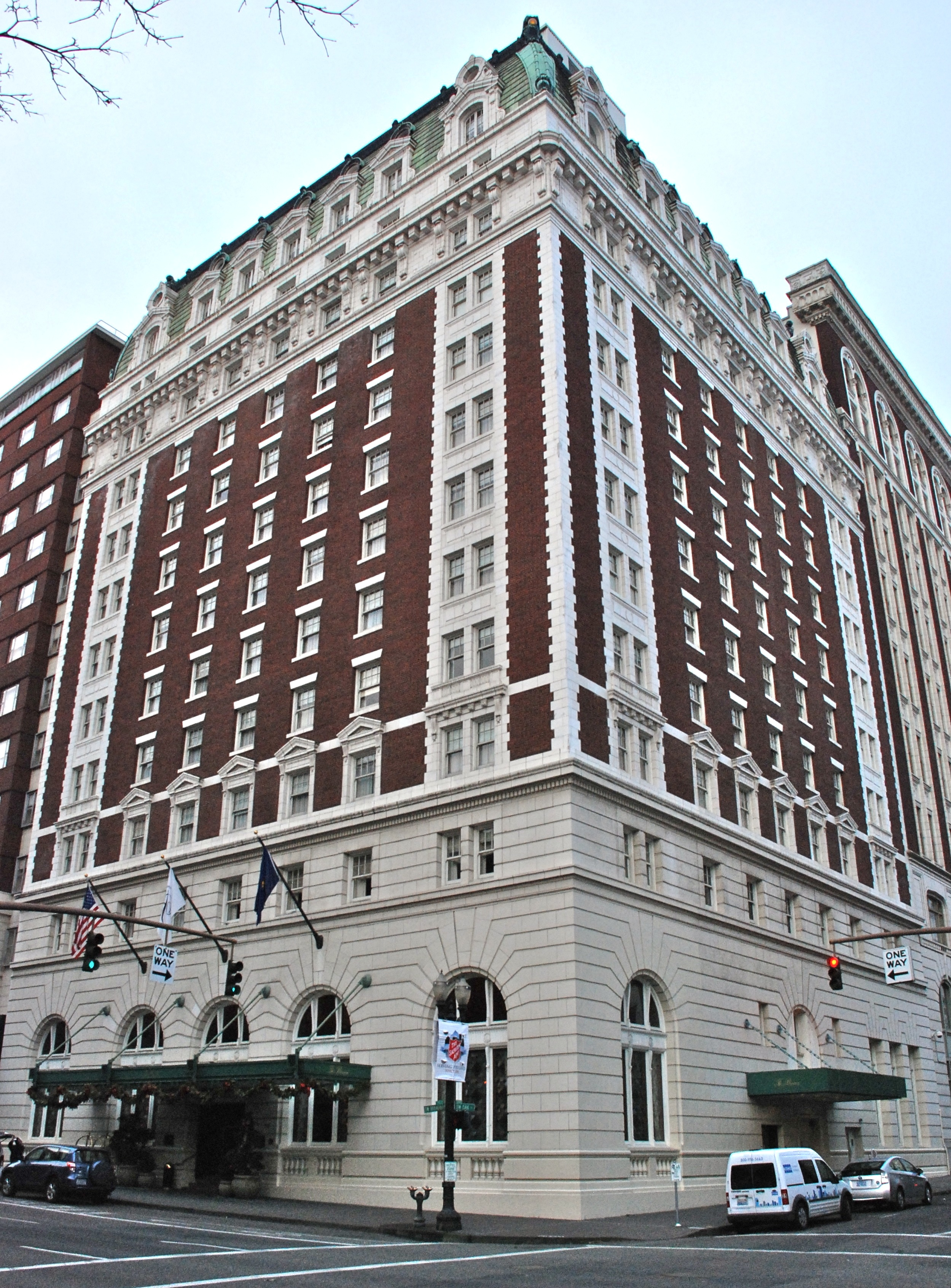
- The building's exterior in 2011

- Location within Portland, Oregon
- Location: 309 SW Broadway; Portland, Oregon
- Coordinates: 45°31′19″N 122°40′43″W
- Built: 1913
- Architect: Doyle, Patterson & Beach
- Architectural style: Second Empire Style
- NRHP reference No.: 86003175
- Added to NRHP: November 20, 1986

The Benson Portland, Curio Collection by Hilton is a 287-room historic hotel in downtown Portland, Oregon, United States. It is owned and operated by Coast Hotels & Resorts. It was originally known as the New Oregon Hotel, and is commonly known as "The Benson". It has a reputation as one of Portland's finest hotels. The hotel is named after notable businessman and philanthropist Simon Benson. The Benson is the seventh largest hotel in Portland based on the number of rooms.

== History ==
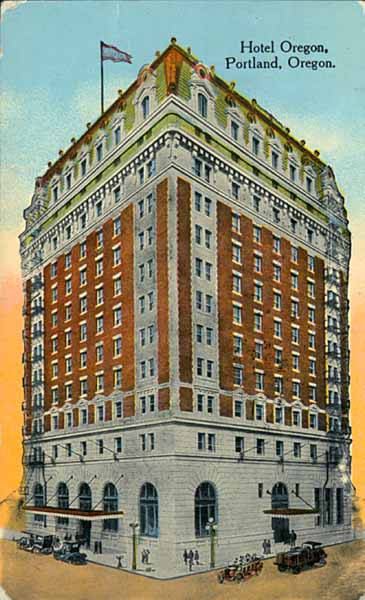
Postcard

=== Early history ===
The first hotel on the site was the Hotel Oregon, which was located on the southern half of the current hotel's location. Originally designed as an office building, it was constructed by local Chinese businessmen Moy Back Yin and Goon Dip. With the Lewis and Clark Centennial Exposition expected to draw massive crowds in 1905, the Wright-Dickinson Company, based in Washington state, leased the structure during construction and completed it as a hotel, which opened early that year. The Hotel Oregon was an immediate success, and an annex was soon added in the rear.

=== Current building ===
With the city's population booming, Wright-Dickinson partnered in 1911 with local businessman Simon Benson to construct a modern tower wing addition to the Hotel Oregon on the northern half of the block. The firm of Doyle, Patterson & Beach designed the building in the French Second Empire style, with Chicago's Blackstone Hotel serving as a design inspiration.

The new wing opened on March 4, 1913, timed to coincide with the inauguration of President Woodrow Wilson. A telegram was sent from Washington, so the hotel's doors could be opened just as he took the oath of office. The new wing was known as the New Oregon Hotel for the next 16 months, and operated jointly with the existing hotel.

=== Benson Hotel ===
In 1914, Simon Benson assumed direct operation of the new wing and renamed it the Hotel Benson, operating it now as a separate business. Benson sold the hotel to William Boyd and Robert Keller in 1919. The adjoining Hotel Oregon closed in 1924, due to the economic effects of prohibition in the United States, but reopened in 1932, still operated by Wright-Dickinson.

Boyd and Keller sold the Hotel Benson to Seattle-based Western Hotels in 1944. The 1905 Hotel Oregon building was purchased and demolished by Western in 1957, to make way for a 200-room annex to the Hotel Benson, built at a cost of $3,000,000, which doubled the hotel's size. Designed by Jones, Lovegren, Helms and Jones, it opened in 1959 and contained a Trader Vic's on the ground level.

Western International Hotels was renamed Westin Hotels in 1981, and the hotel became The Westin Benson. The Westin Benson was added to the National Register of Historic Places in 1986. Westin Hotels sold the hotel to WestCoast Hotels (now Coast Hotels & Resorts) in 1988 and it returned to its original name.

El Gaucho Restaurant is on the ground floor of the 1959 wing, where Trader Vic's was once located.

The Jimi Hendrix Experience drummer Mitch Mitchell died in his hotel room at the Benson Hotel on November 12, 2008.

On October 6, 2021, the hotel was rebranded as part of Curio Collection by Hilton, a division of Hilton Hotels.

== Reception ==
The hotel was a finalist in the Best Hotel category of Willamette Week's annual 'Best of Portland' readers' poll in 2025.
