= Campbell Court Hotel =

Historic building in Portland, Oregon, U.S.

- U.S. National Register of Historic Places
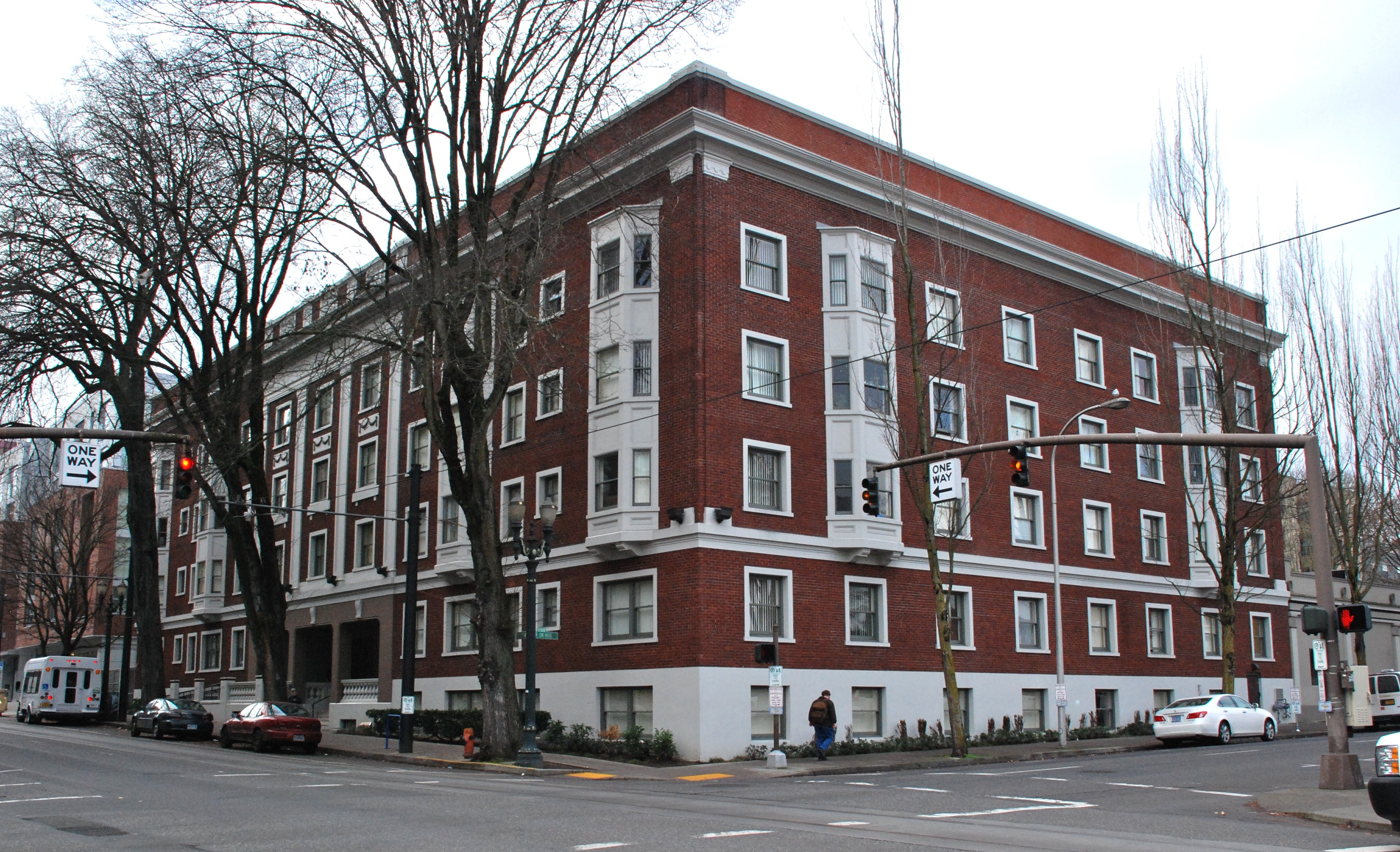
- The building's exterior in 2011

- Location within Portland, Oregon Location within Oregon Location within the United States
- Location: 1115 SW 11th Avenue; Portland, Oregon
- Coordinates: 45°31′03″N 122°41′06″W
- Area: 0.4 acres (0.16 ha)
- Built: 1923
- Architect: Herbert Gordon
- Architectural style: Classical Revival
- MPS: Downtown Portland, Oregon MPS
- NRHP reference No.: 08000559
- Added to NRHP: June 25, 2008

The Campbell Court Hotel is a historic building located at 1115 Southwest 11th Avenue in Portland, Oregon, United States. It is listed on the National Register of Historic Places.

== History ==
Completed in 1923, the building has also been known as the Martha Washington Hotel and the Hotel Rajneesh. It was bombed in 1983, while operating as Hotel Rajneesh. Following a $18 million renovation, the building started being used to as affordable housing for more than 100 residents in mid 2010.

== See also ==
- Campbell Hotel, also listed on the National Register in Portland and now known as the Campbell Court Apartments
- National Register of Historic Places listings in Southwest Portland, Oregon
