= AC Hotel Portland Downtown =

Hotel in Portland, Oregon, U.S.

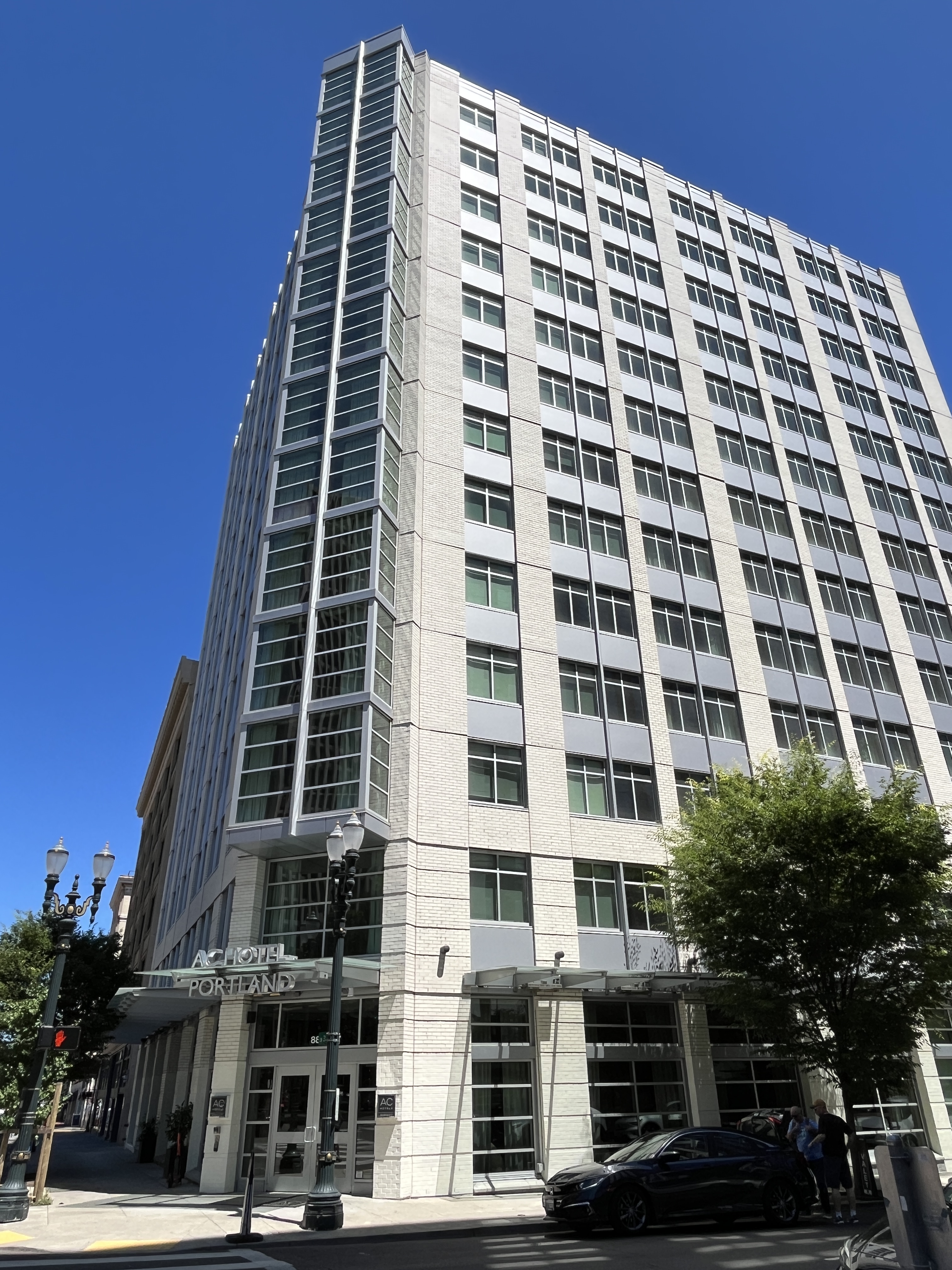
- The hotel's exterior in 2023
- Interactive map of the AC Hotel Portland Downtown area

General information
- Location: 888 Southwest 3rd Avenue, Portland, Oregon, United States
- Coordinates: 45.51691522461549°N 122.67590133641411°W
- Construction started: September 2015
- Completed: February 2017
- Opened: February 20, 2017
- Cost: $50 million

Design and construction
- Architecture firm: SERA Architects
- Engineer: KPFF Consulting Engineers

The AC Hotel Portland Downtown is a 204-room hotel operated by Marriott International in Portland, Oregon. Located at the intersection of Southwest 3rd Avenue and Taylor Street, the 13-floor hotel opened in 2017.

== Description ==
The hotel has 13 stories and 204 guest rooms. The lobby has a handpainted mural by Damien Gilley. Behind the front desk is a mural by Jason Prouty depicting a scene from brewer Henry Weinhard's Barrel Room. The interior also has "floating shelves, air plants and natural wood features". The lobby's coffee shop has the only Alpha Dominche Steampunk espresso machine in Oregon, according to Willamette Week, which included the coffee maker in a 2018 list of "fifteen special features of Portland's high-end hotels locals need to know about".

The hotel has a bar called AC Lounge, as well as a fitness center, a library, and meeting rooms. Caleb Diehl of Oregon Business described the lobby's design as "a blend of the natural — granite panels framing the window of 'The Slab' coffee shop, wall-mounted naturalist sketches — and the modern stainless steel tables, marble walls, a minimalist black-and-white color scheme)." Diehl also noted in 2017, "The business desk offered Macs... The reading selection featured bold modern typefaces and insights on photography, coffee and tech."

== History ==
The hotel, among the first AC-branded in the U.S., was designed by SERA Architects. KPFF Consulting Engineers and M.A. Mortenson Company were the engineering firm and design-builder, respectively. Construction on the $50 million project took place from September 2015 to February 2017. Previously, the site was occupied by a 30,000 square foot office building, which was demolished. The hotel was open to guests on February 20, 2017, a few months later than the originally scheduled opening date of December 2016.

== Reception ==
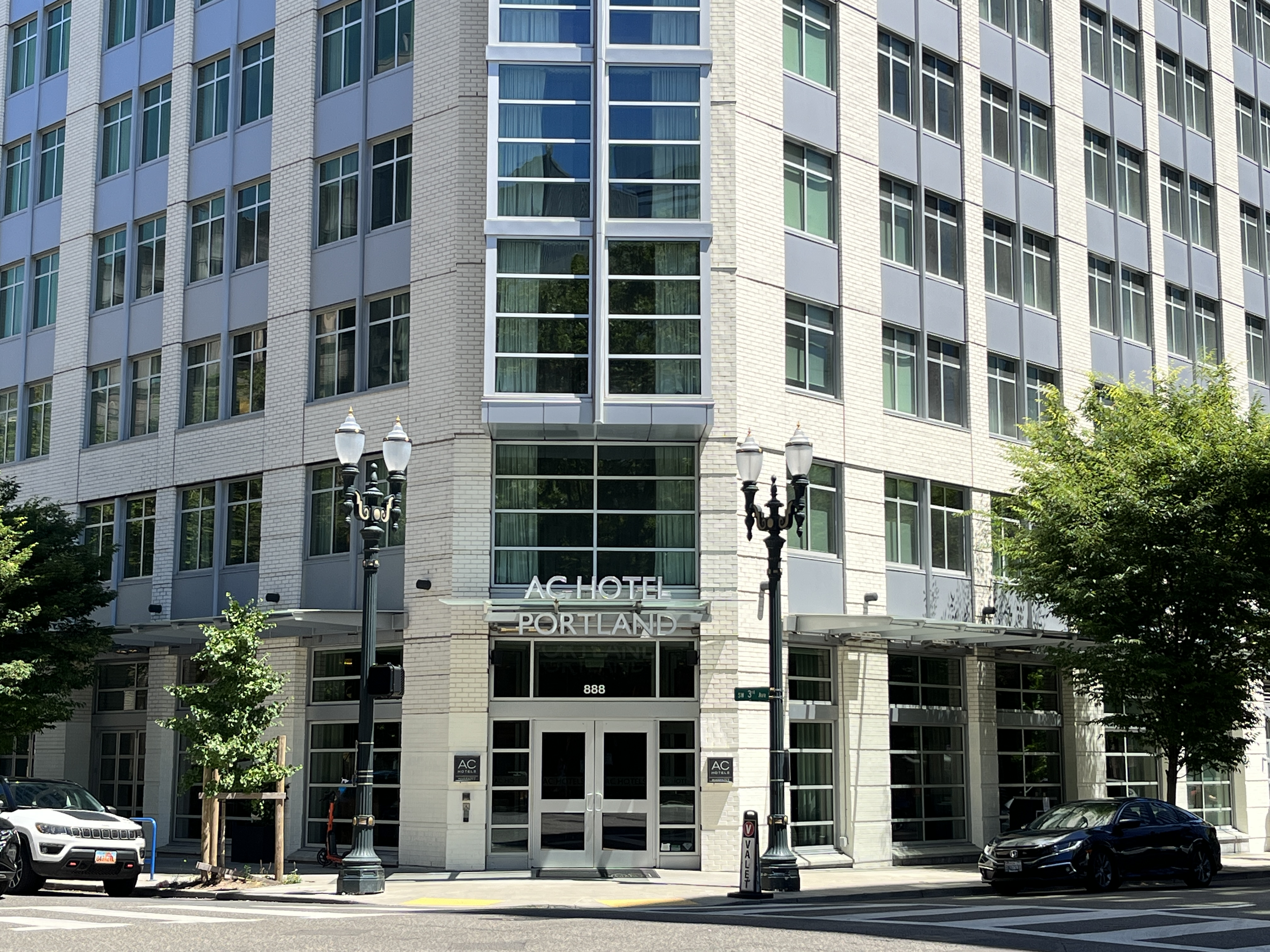
Front entrance, 2023

The hotel placed first in the hospitality category of the Daily Journal of Commerce's "top projects" for 2018. Jen Stevenson of Condé Nast Traveler wrote, "this sleek new downtown Portland boutique hotel is short on non-essentials and long on style, targeting effortlessly hip young travelers. Don't expect conventional extras like alarm clocks, a concierge, or even room service... Do, however, expect clean, modern design, an efficient staff, and a beautiful little marble-backed lobby bar, just the spot for a revitalizing gin and tonic and bowl of citrus-marinated olives or spiced pistachios".
