= Hotel Grand Stark =

Planned hotel in Portland, Oregon, U.S.

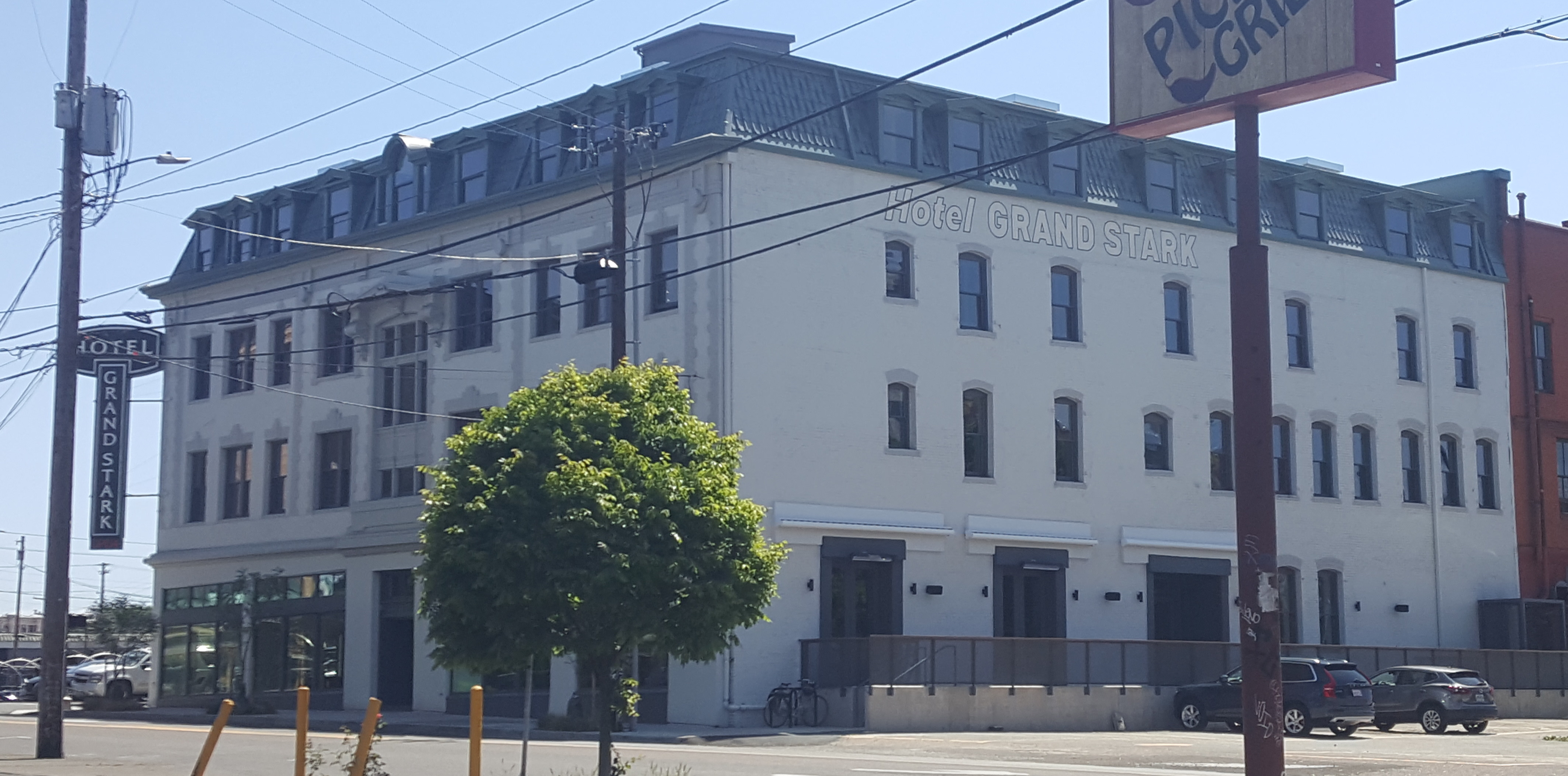
- The hotel's exterior in 2021
- Interactive map of the Hotel Grand Stark area

General information
- Location: Portland, Oregon, United States
- Coordinates: 45°31′9″N 122°39′40″W

Hotel Grand Stark is a 57-room hotel in Portland, Oregon, United States. The project is a partnership between the real estate firms Urban Development + Partners and Beam Development.

== Description ==
The hotel has housed multiple restaurants, including Grand Amari and the cocktail lounge Little Bitter Bar.

== History ==
Hotel Grand Stark opened in May 2021. The Italian restaurant Grand Amari and Little Bitter Bar closed in 2025, operating for approximately two years.
