= Hyatt Regency Portland =

Hotel in Portland, Oregon, U.S.

Hyatt Regency Portland at the Oregon Convention Center
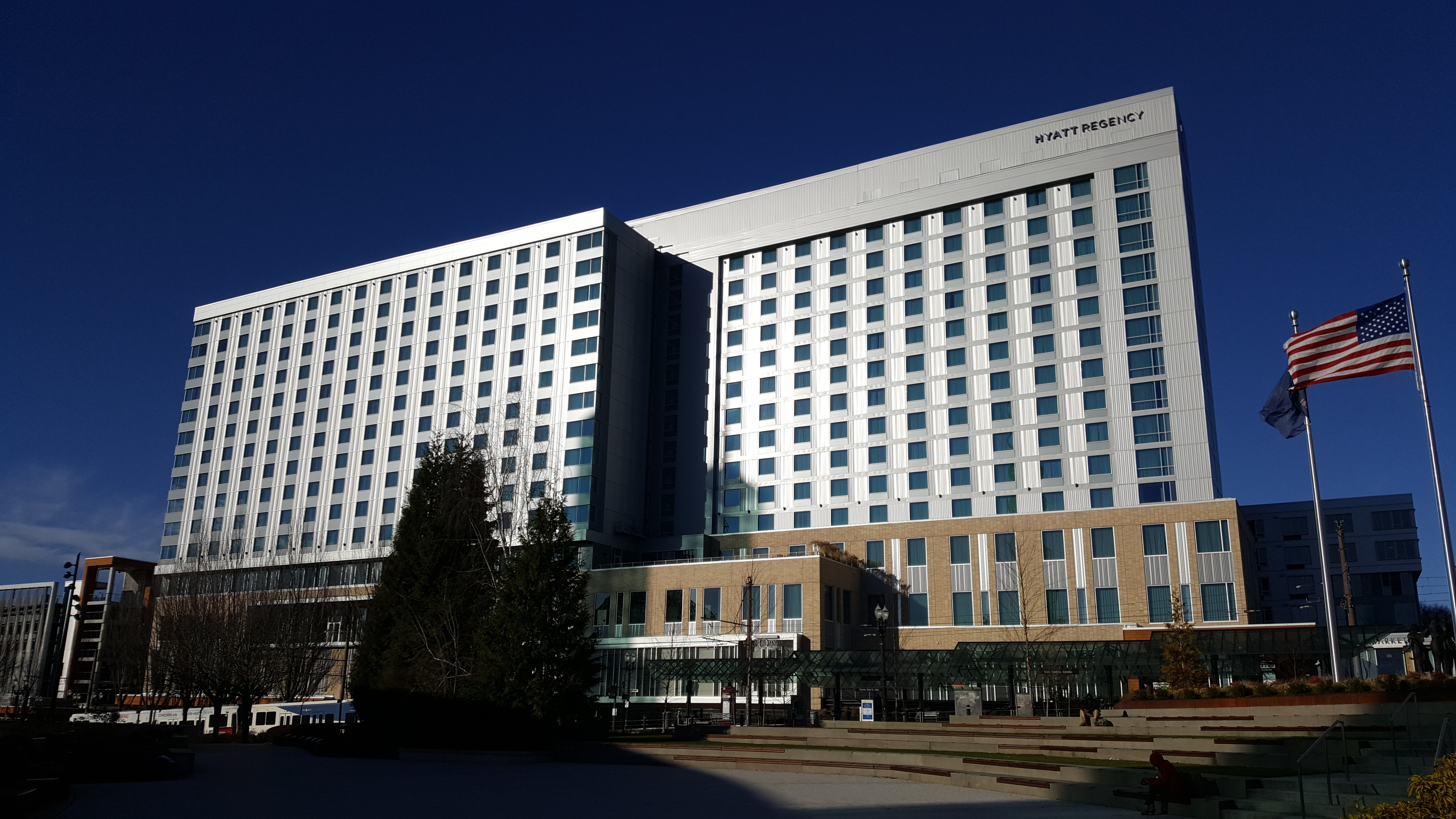
- The hotel's exterior in 2021
- Interactive map of the Hyatt Regency Portland at the Oregon Convention Center area

General information
- Location: Portland, Oregon, United States
- Coordinates: 45.5302916°N 122.6620194°W
- Opened: December 19, 2019
- Cost: $224 million
- Owner: Hyatt Hotels Corporation

Technical details
- Floor count: 14

Other information
- Number of rooms: 600

The Hyatt Regency Portland at the Oregon Convention Center is a high-rise building and Hyatt hotel in Portland, Oregon. It is located on Northeast Holladay Street at 2nd Avenue, in the Lloyd District, across the street from the Oregon Convention Center. The hotel also has 39,000 square feet of convention space.

== History ==
The hotel opened on December 19, 2019. The brand new hotel closed just three months later, in March 2020, due to the COVID-19 pandemic. The hotel reopened on May 24, 2021.
