= Porter Portland =

Hotel in Portland, Oregon, U.S.

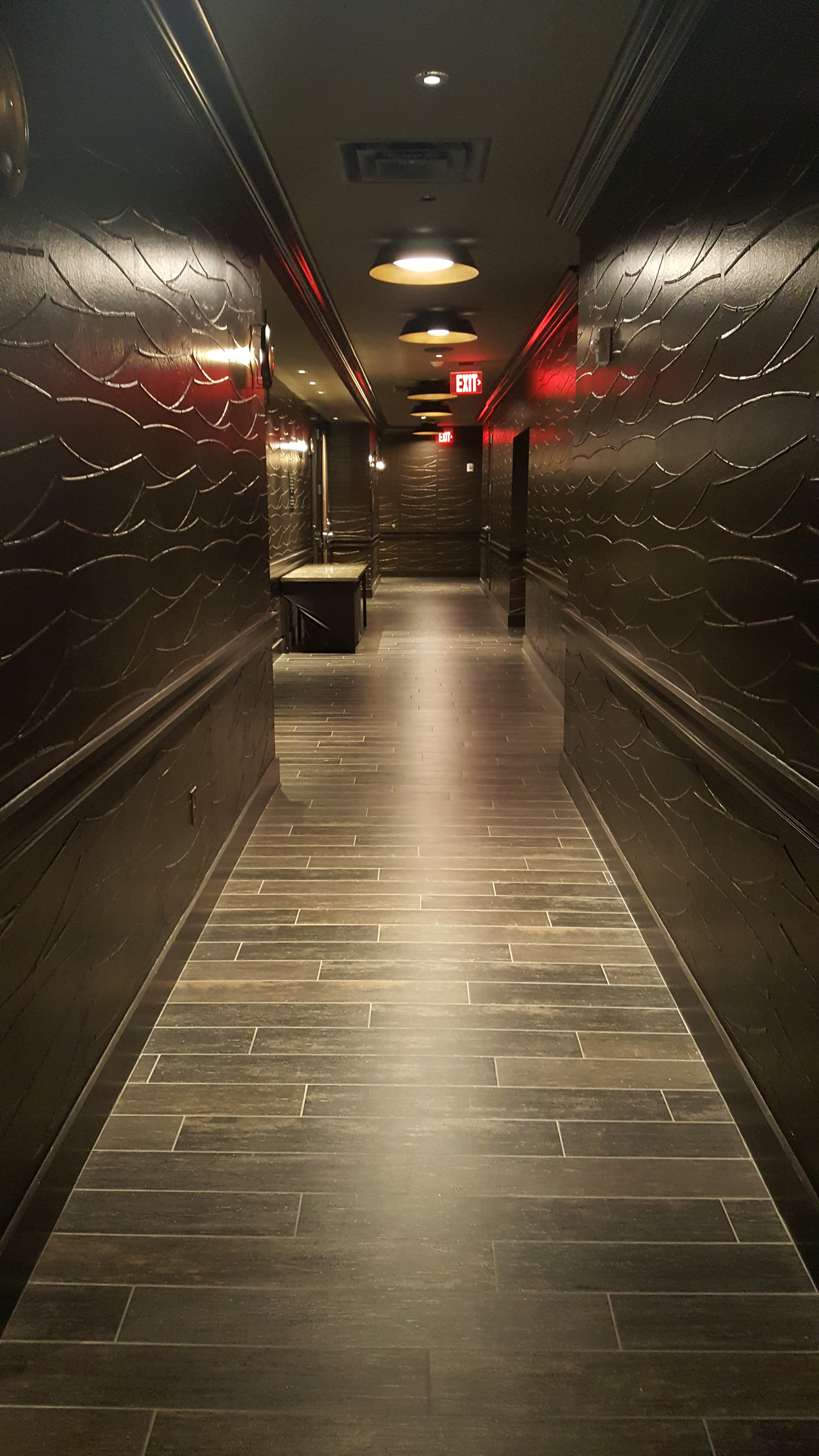
- Interior hallway, 2022
- Interactive map of the Porter Portland area

General information
- Location: Portland, Oregon, United States
- Coordinates: 45°30′49.7″N 122°40′37.6″W

The Porter Portland is a hotel operated by Hilton Worldwide in Portland, Oregon, as part of its Curio Collection.

Establishments within the hotel included Chiosco, Portland Exchange Grocer & Goods, Terrane Italian Kitchen + Bar, and Xport Bar & Lounge.

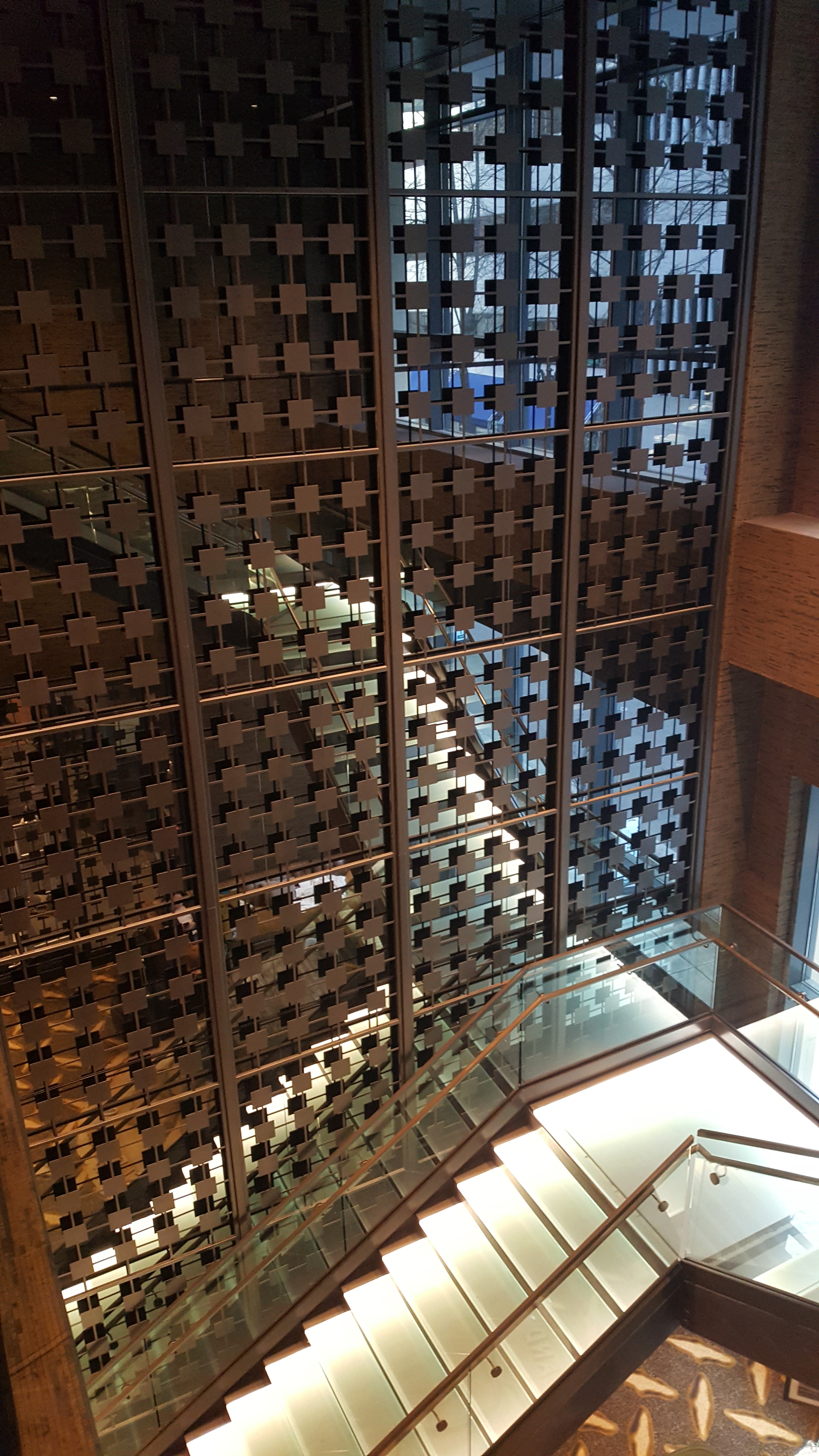
Interior staircase

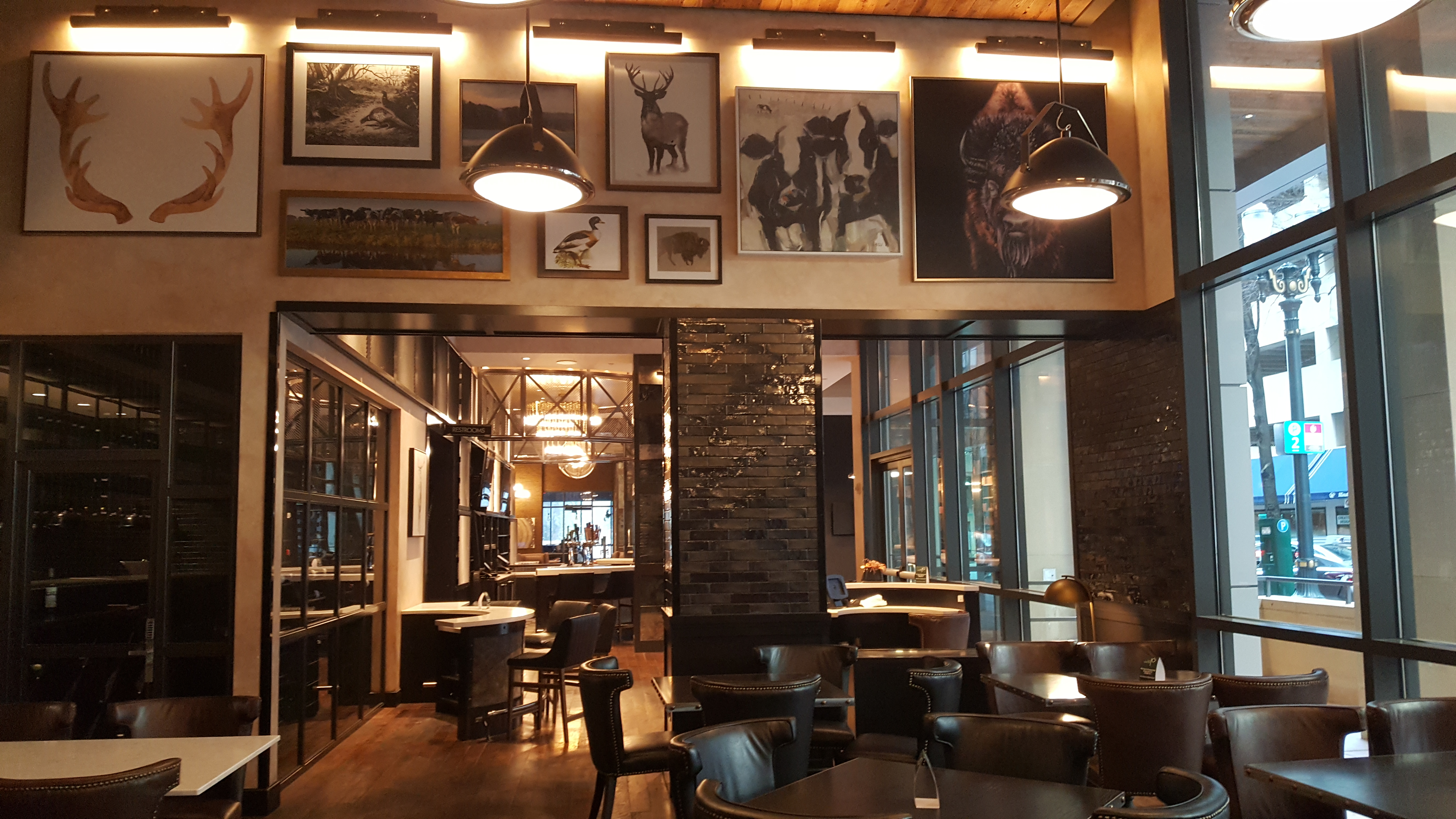
Terrane Italian Kitchen + Bar

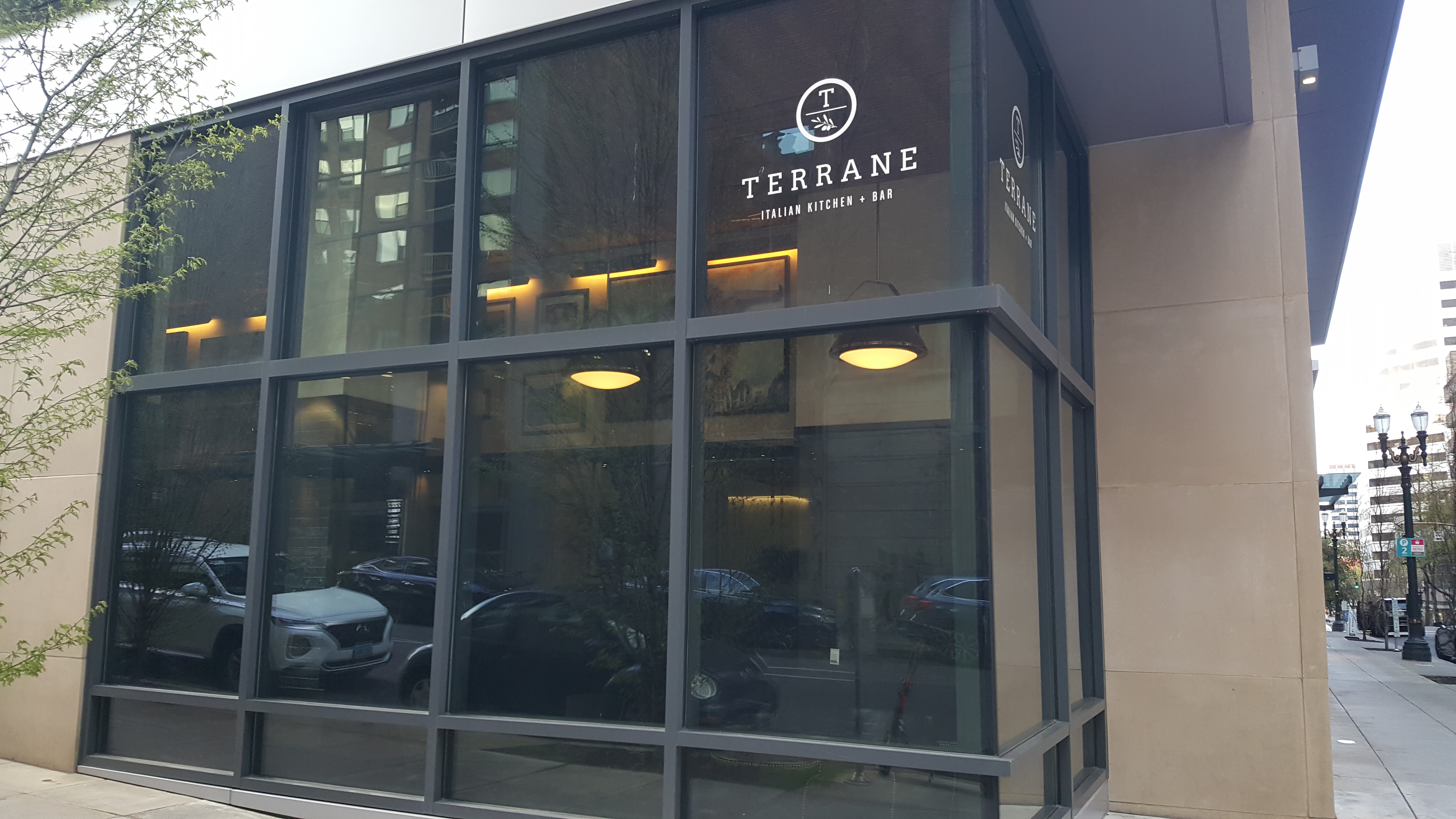
The restaurant's exterior
