= Holiday Inn Portland-Columbia Riverfront =

Hotel in Portland, Oregon, U.S.

- Interactive map of the Holiday Inn Portland-Columbia Riverfront area
- Alternative names: Red Lion Motor Inn-Jantzen Beach; Red Lion Motor Inn at Jantzen Beach; Red Lion Hotel on the River Jantzen Beach

General information
- Location: 909 North Hayden Island Drive, Portland, Oregon, United States
- Coordinates: 45°36′47″N 122°40′31″W

The Holiday Inn Portland-Columbia Riverfront (formerly the Red Lion Hotel on the River Jantzen Beach) is a hotel in Portland, Oregon. The hotel is located on Hayden Island, along the Columbia River east of the Interstate Bridge. Construction cost $18 million.

== History ==
The hotel opened in 1978 as the DoubleTree Hotel Jantzen Beach. It was sold to Red Lion in the late 1990s. Howard Dietrich Jr. owned the hotel, as of 2012.

The hotel was sold to IHG in early 2022 and soon became the Holiday Inn Portland-Columbia Riverfront.

=== Events ===
In 2011, various events hosted at the hotel included American Idol auditions, a public memorial for Red Lion co-founder Ed Pietz, a ballroom dancing competition, a Native American Rehabilitation Association of the Northwest conference, and a school gala. The hotel has also hosted a mobilization ceremony, the Junior State of America's Pacific Northwest Winter Congress, the River City Bluegrass Festival, and OryCon, Portland's annual science fiction and fantasy convention.
