= Canopy by Hilton Portland Pearl District =

Hotel in Portland, Oregon, U.S.

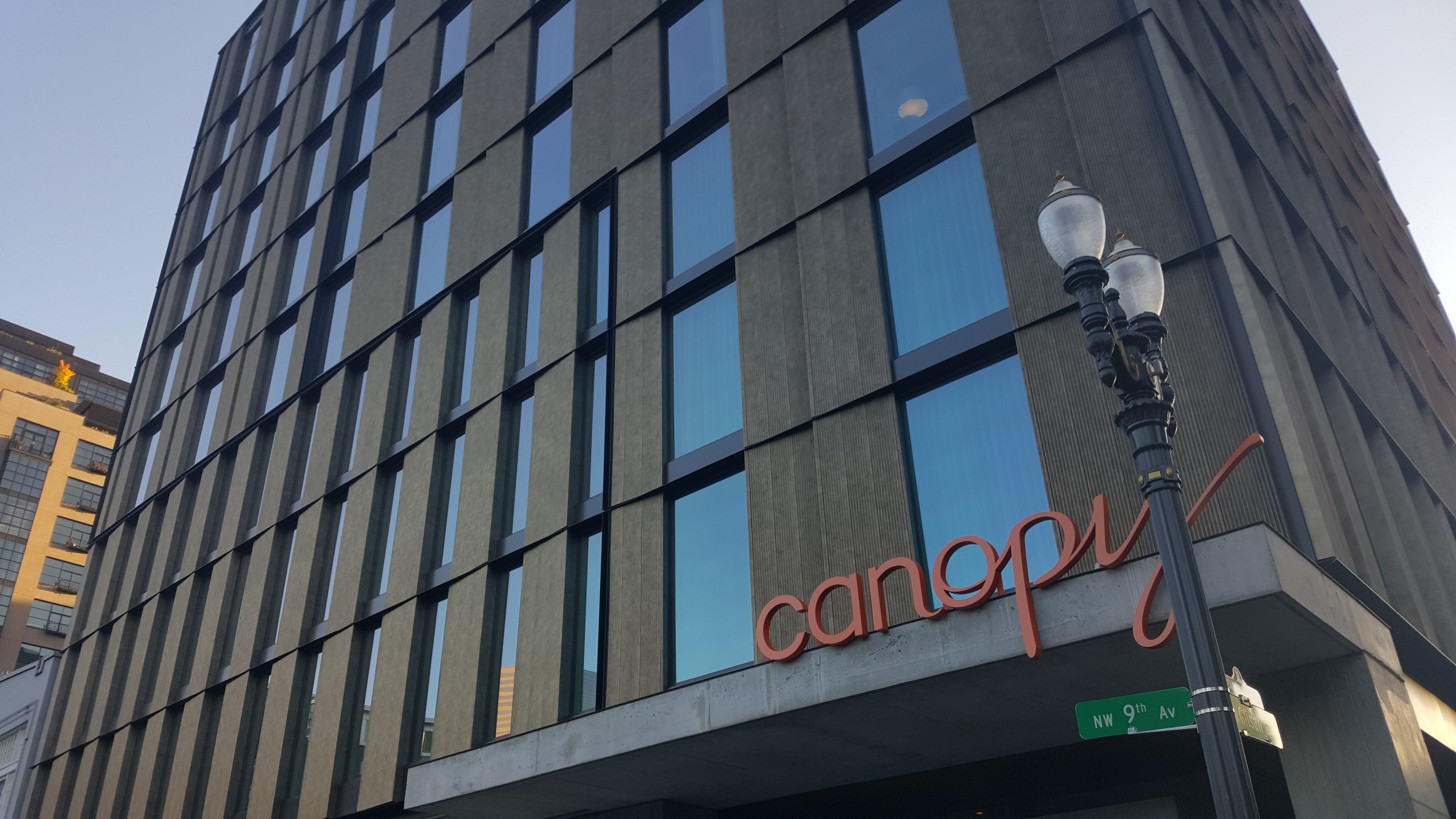
- The hotel's exterior in 2019
- Interactive map of the Canopy by Hilton Portland Pearl District area

General information
- Location: 425 Northwest 9th Avenue, Portland, Oregon, United States
- Coordinates: 45.526389°N 122.680278°W

The Canopy by Hilton Portland Pearl District is a 10-story hotel operated by Hilton Worldwide's Canopy by Hilton brand in Portland, Oregon's Pearl District.

== Description ==
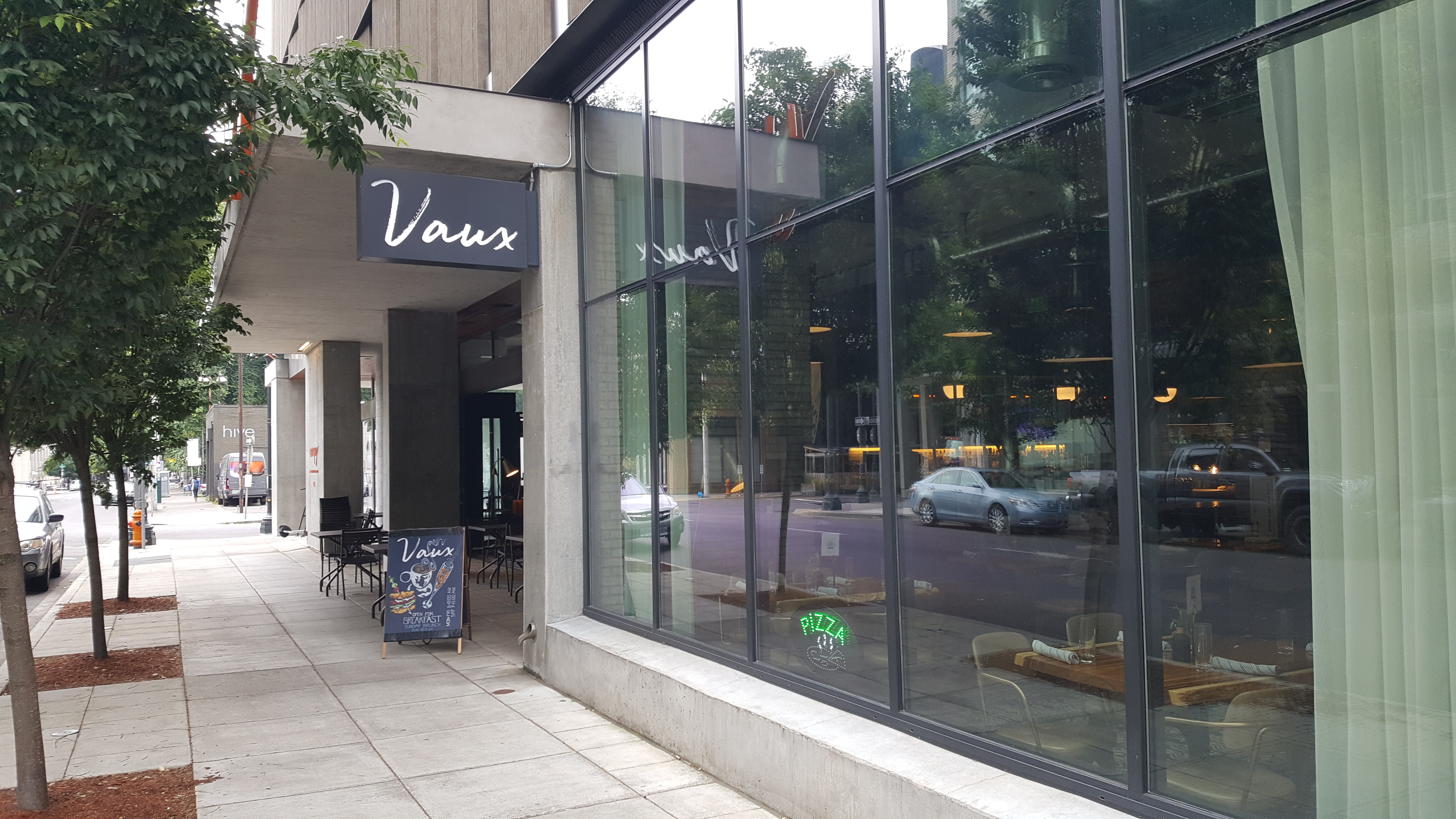
Exterior of Vaux, 2022

The 153-room property marks the brand's first to open on the West Coast. The exterior and interior were designed by the firms ZGF Architects and Mark Zeff, respectively. All guest rooms have 9-foot floor-to-ceiling windows. Elizabeth Leach Gallery is the hotel's art curator; works by Judy Cooke, Stephen Hayes, Charlene Liu, and Mark Smith are on display. The interior also features "raw steel, Pendleton wool fabrics, [and] industrial touches".

The largest rooms are 330 square feet; other amenities include a fitness center, complimentary bicycle use, and rooftop games such as cornhole. Janet Eastman described the hotel's lobby as "spirited" in The Oregonian's 2019 overview of "Portland hotel lobby scene", writing, "Canopy by Hilton Portland's long, narrow lobby draws you past the discreet reception counter in the front, then food and drinks service on one side and a series of glass panels framing Pearl District strollers on the other."

== History ==
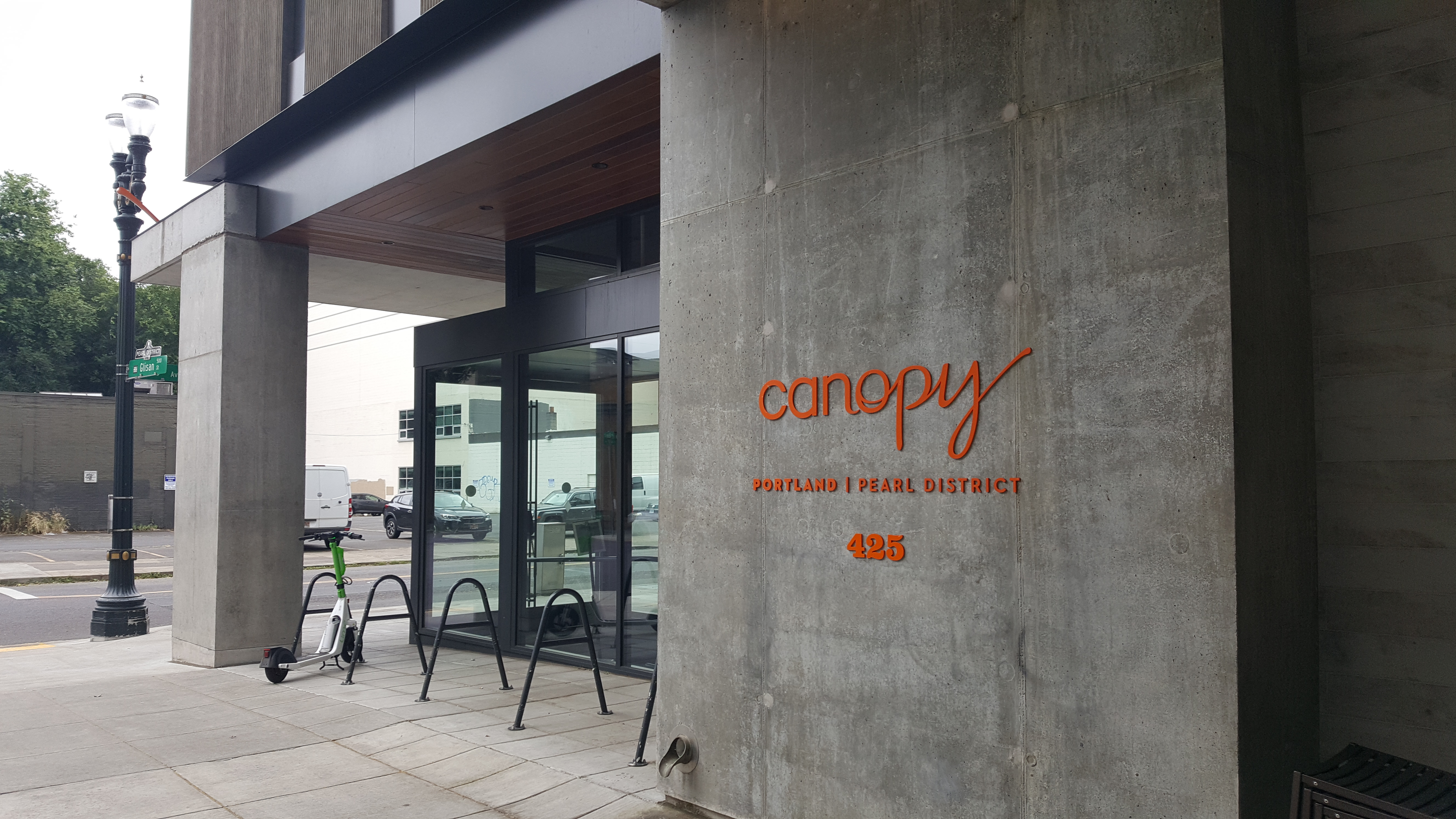
Street entrance, 2022

The project was announced in November 2014, and construction led by Bremik Construction began in 2015. Menashe Properties was the commercial real estate investment firm behind the hotel. The LEED Gold certified hotel opened in July 2018 and launched a sustainability program. The hotel was managed by PM Hotel Group, as of 2019.

In 2018, local media outlets described plans for a 60-seat hotel restaurant also called Canopy, serving breakfast, lunch, and coffee; the menu was to include pizza and Pacific Northwest-inspired dishes. The restaurant Vaux opened in the hotel on August 9, 2019.

In late 2020, the hotel joined the Rose City Downtown Collective, described by KATU as "a group of downtown Portland businesses and organizations is asking for help in rebuilding 'the spirit' of the city’s core, which has been hit hard by months of coronavirus restrictions and protests".

== Reception ==
In 2019, the hotel was recognized by the Daily Journal of Commerce as a "TopProject". In 2021, Lori A. May included the hotel in Business Insider's overview of the 18 best Hilton properties in the United States.
