= Society Hotel =

- The hotel's logo

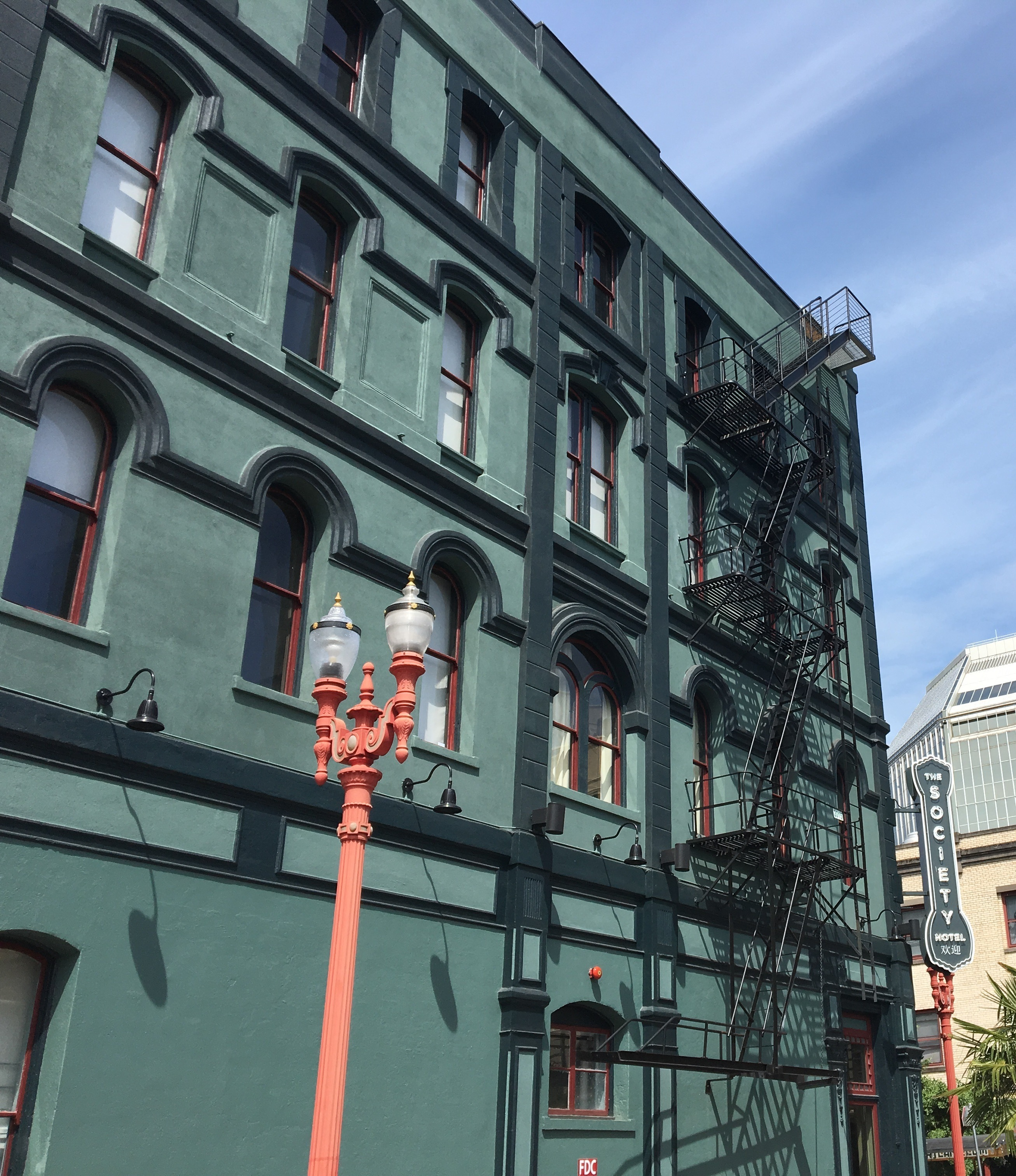
- The hotel's exterior
- Interactive map of the Society Hotel area

General information
- Location: 203 NW 3rd Avenue, Portland, Oregon, United States
- Coordinates: 45.5247°N 122.6737°W

Website
- portland.thesocietyhotel.com

The Society Hotel is a hotel in Portland, Oregon, United States. The building previously served as a boarding house for sailors.

There has also been a Society Hotel location in Bingen, Washington.

== Description ==
The Portland hotel has accommodations ranging from bunk-style hostel rooms to larger suites. There is also a rooftop deck with panoramic views. Condé Nast Traveler called the hotel an "ideal downtown home base" for "the adventurous traveler who's planning on being out and about and isn't interested in excessive (and expensive) amenities".

== History ==
In 2025, two people were arrest for vandalism and attempting to break into the hotel.

In 2026, Jessie Burke and Jonathan Cohen announced plans to sell the hotel.
