= Hilton Santa Monica Hotel & Suites =

Hotel in Santa Monica, California, U.S.

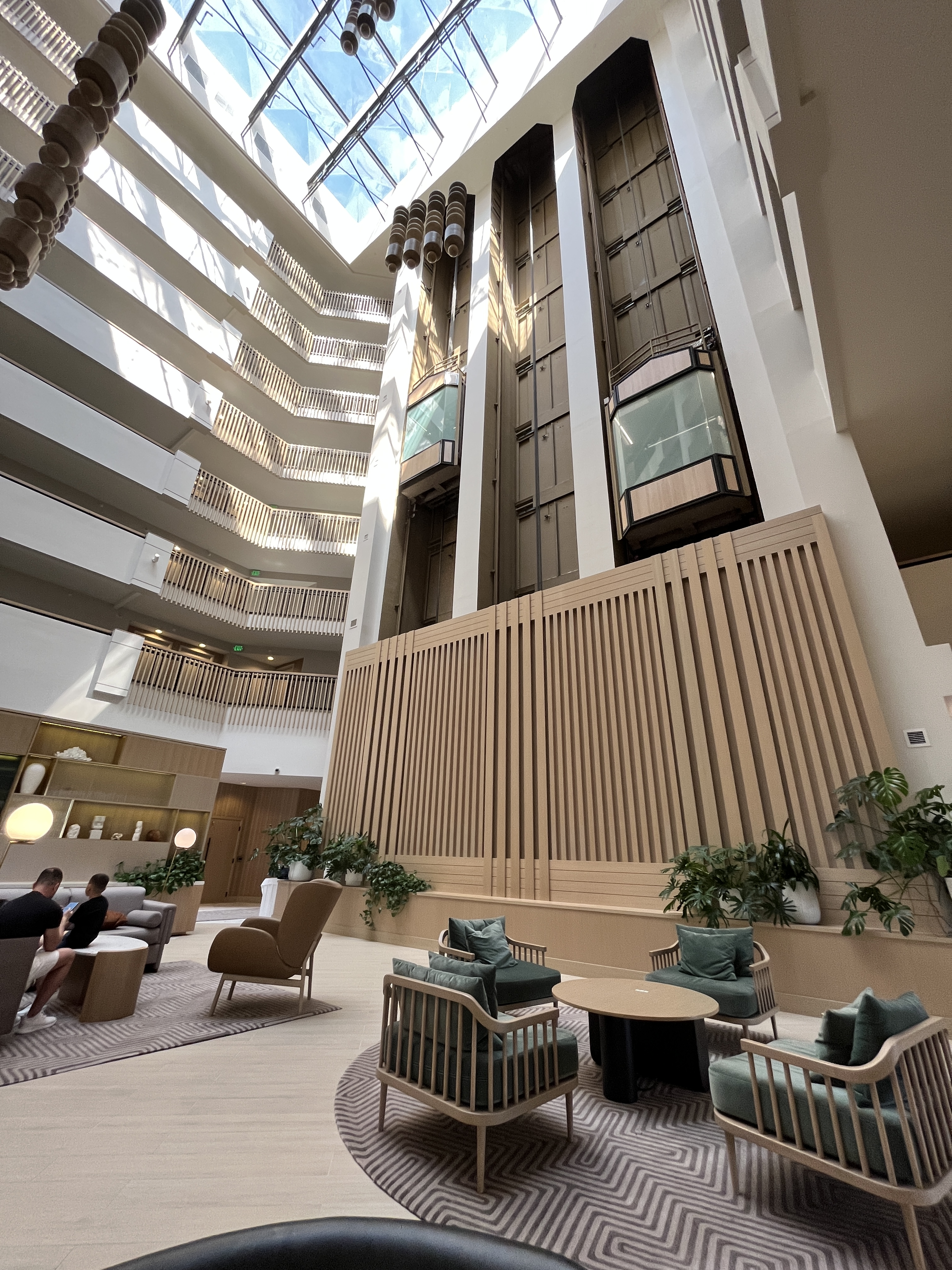
- Interior lobby, 2022
- Interactive map of the Hilton Santa Monica Hotel & Suites area

General information
- Type: Hotel
- Location: Santa Monica, CA 90401, 1707 4th St, Santa Monica, California, United States
- Coordinates: 34.01172°N 118.48900°W
- Completed: 1990
- Renovated: 2021
- Owner: Hilton Hotels

Technical details
- Floor count: 8

Hilton Santa Monica Hotel & Suites is a 286-room hotel in Santa Monica, California, in the United States.

== History ==
Built in 1990, the eight-floor hotel was last renovated in 2021. Previously operated by DoubleTree Suites as a 253-room hotel, the Hilton Santa Monica reopened in April 2021 following a two-year redesign and renovation. Additional rooms were added by splitting presidential suites and relocating the lounge.

In 2022, someone filed a lawsuit against the hotel for allegedly recording phone calls without warning.

== Features ==
The hotel has 7,773 square feet of meeting space and a rooftop pool. All rooms have modular dining tables with power outlets to function as workstations, and the hotel's tech lounge has charging stations and long tables for coworking.

Monica's operates as the hotel's signature restaurant as of 2022. The menu includes West Coast fish and produce.

== See also ==
- List of hotels in the United States
