= DoubleTree by Hilton Hotel Portland =

Hotel in Portland, Oregon, U.S.

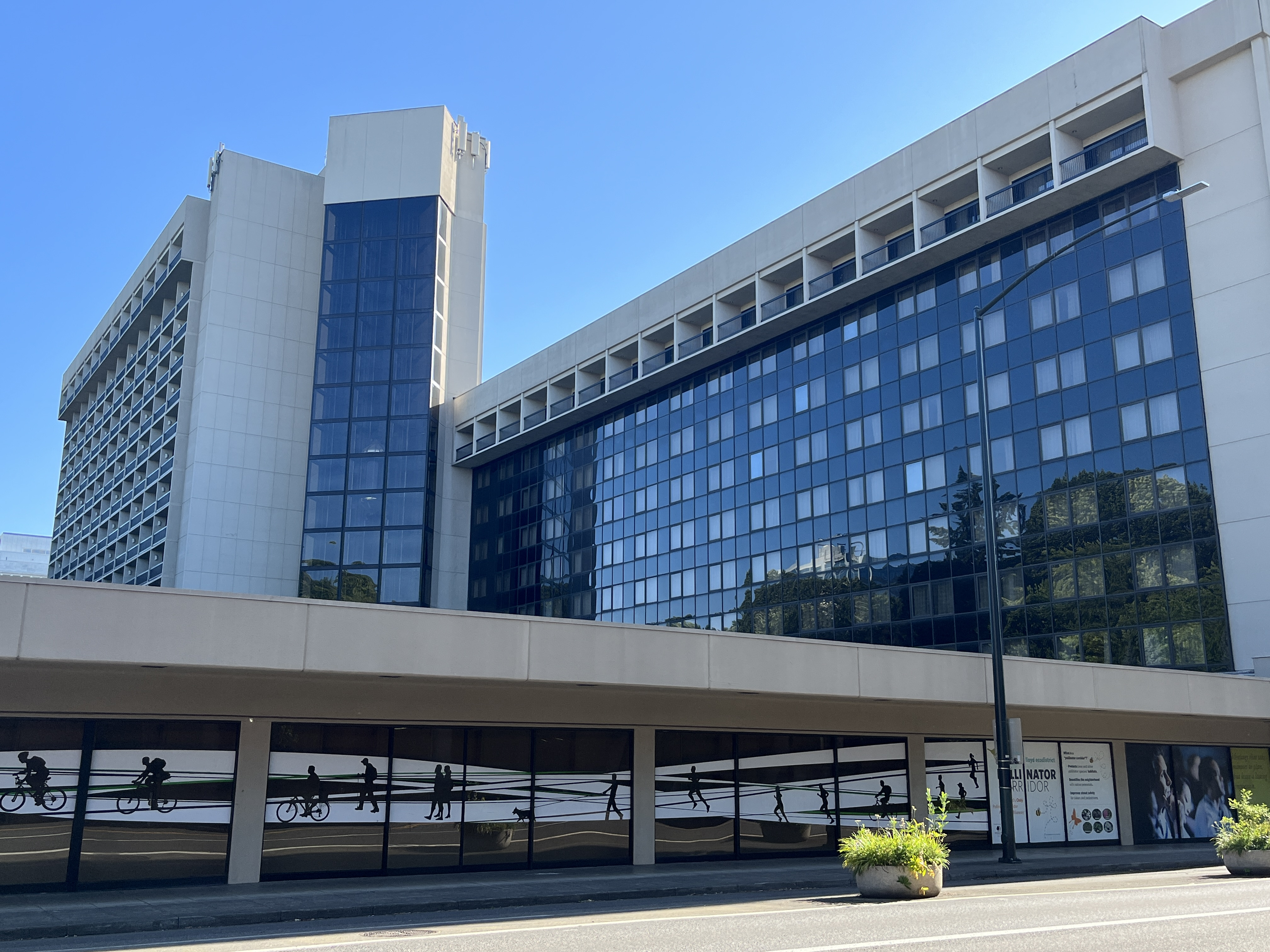
- Taller 1982 wing on left, shorter 1959 wing on right
- Interactive map of the DoubleTree by Hilton Hotel Portland area
- Former names: Sheraton-Portland Hotel; Red Lion Inn/Lloyd Center

General information
- Location: 1000 Northeast Multnomah Street, Portland, Oregon, United States
- Coordinates: 45°31′51″N 122°39′20″W
- Opened: September 28, 1959
- Cost: $6 million

DoubleTree by Hilton Hotel Portland is a hotel in Portland, Oregon's Lloyd District, in the United States. The hotel opened as the Sheraton-Portland Hotel in 1959, and in 1980 became the Red Lion Inn/Lloyd Center.

The hotel has been credited with playing "a crucial role in the development of Portland's eastside". After an expansion in the early 1980s, for a time it was the largest hotel in all of Oregon.

== Description ==
The hotel is one of the five largest in Portland, with 477 guest rooms as of 2020. The property also has restaurants, a covered parking garage and a conference center. The hotel has fifteen floors and multiple glass elevators. The outdoor pool, among few at Portland hotels, can accommodate approximately 20 to 30 people.

== History ==
The hotel opened as the Sheraton-Portland Hotel on September 28, 1959, owned by the Lloyd Corporation and operated by Sheraton Hotels. It was the first new hotel in Portland since the opening of the New Heathman Hotel, in 1928. It was renamed the Sheraton Motor Inn in 1963.

In June 1980, the hotel was purchased from the Lloyd Corp. by the Thunderbird–Red Lion Inns chain, and became the Red Lion Inn/Lloyd Center on August 1 of that year, the latter part of the name referring to the Lloyd Center mall, located across Multnomah Street from the hotel. The nine-story hotel had 276 rooms at that time, but a major expansion – including the addition of a 15-story tower – was planned. When the expanded hotel reopened in 1982, it had 520 rooms and was the largest hotel in all of Oregon.

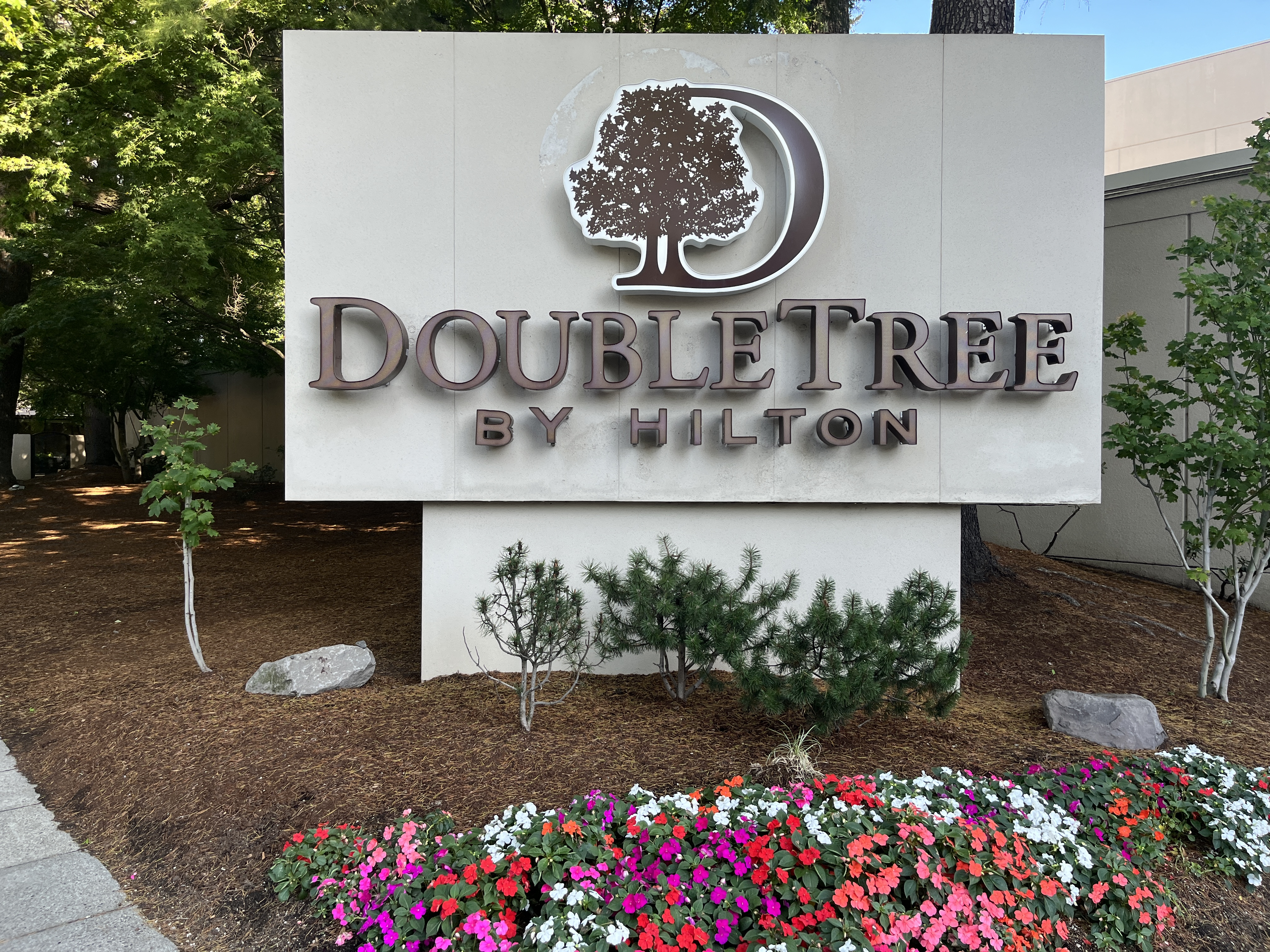
Sign for the hotel, 2022

In 1989, with 476 rooms, the Red Lion Inn/Lloyd Center was still the second-largest hotel in the state, after the 503-room Portland Marriott Hotel in Downtown Portland. In September 1996, its owner, Red Lion Hotels, Inc., then based in Vancouver, Washington, entered into an agreement to be acquired by then-Phoenix-based Doubletree Corp. The merger closed on November 8, 1996, and the Lloyd Center hotel was renamed the Doubletree Hotel Portland. In October 1998, Doubletree announced plans to expand the hotel with a new 300-room tower to be constructed on the northeast corner of the property, in order to make the hotel a 'headquarters hotel' for the nearby Oregon Convention Center. The addition was never built. In late 2010 and 2011, all Doubletree hotels were rebranded as "DoubleTree by Hilton".

A woman was found dead in one of the hotel's stairwells in late 2014. A Washington man was accused of murder and arrested. The woman's family sued Hilton and the hotel's owners.

In 2019, a man filed a $10-million lawsuit against the hotel, claiming that he was racially profiled during his stay in 2018. The hotel issued an apology and fired two employees. The hotel's operator, Hilton Hotels & Resorts, said that the company has "zero tolerance for racism".

== Reception ==
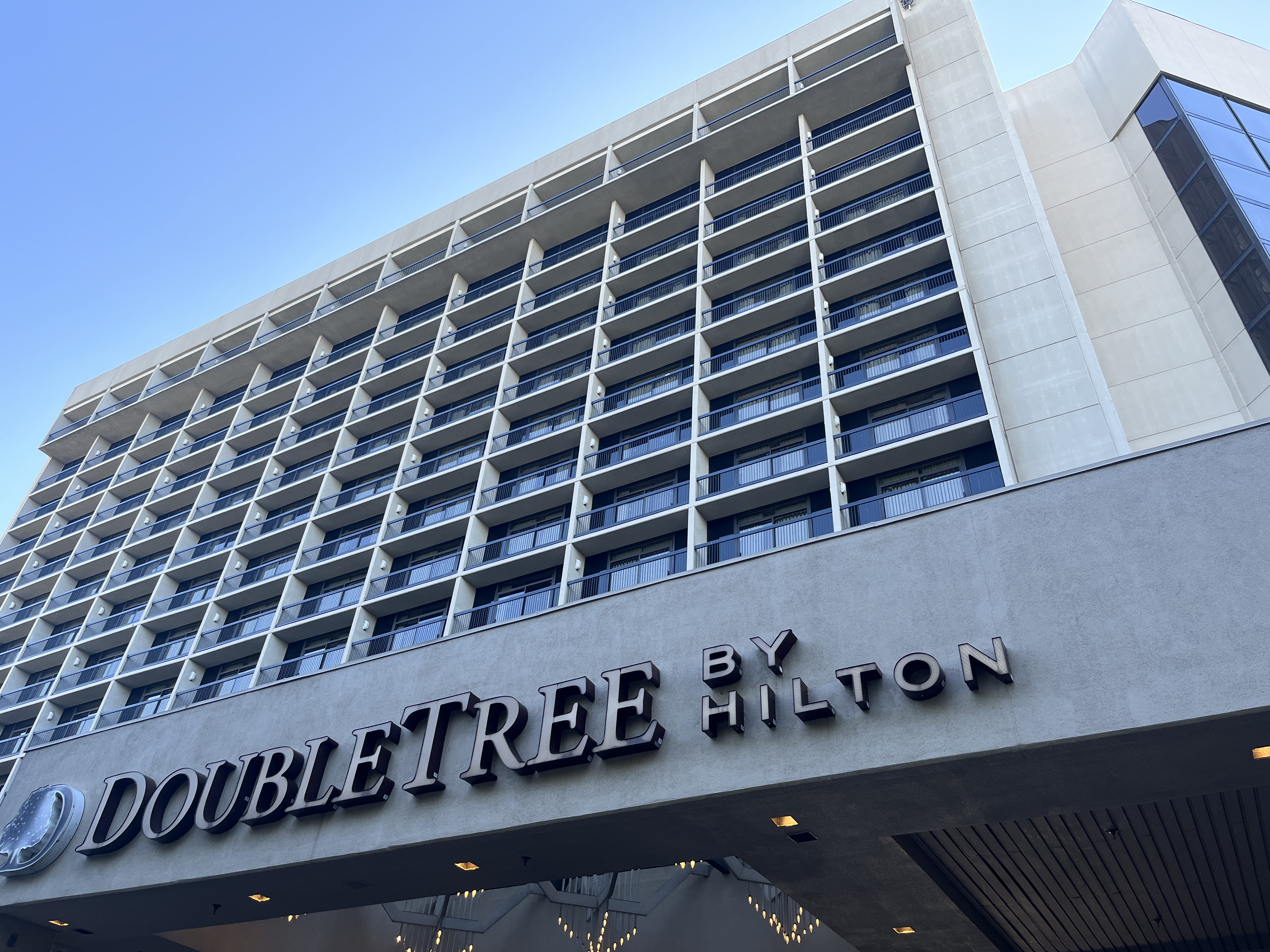
Hotel exterior in 2022

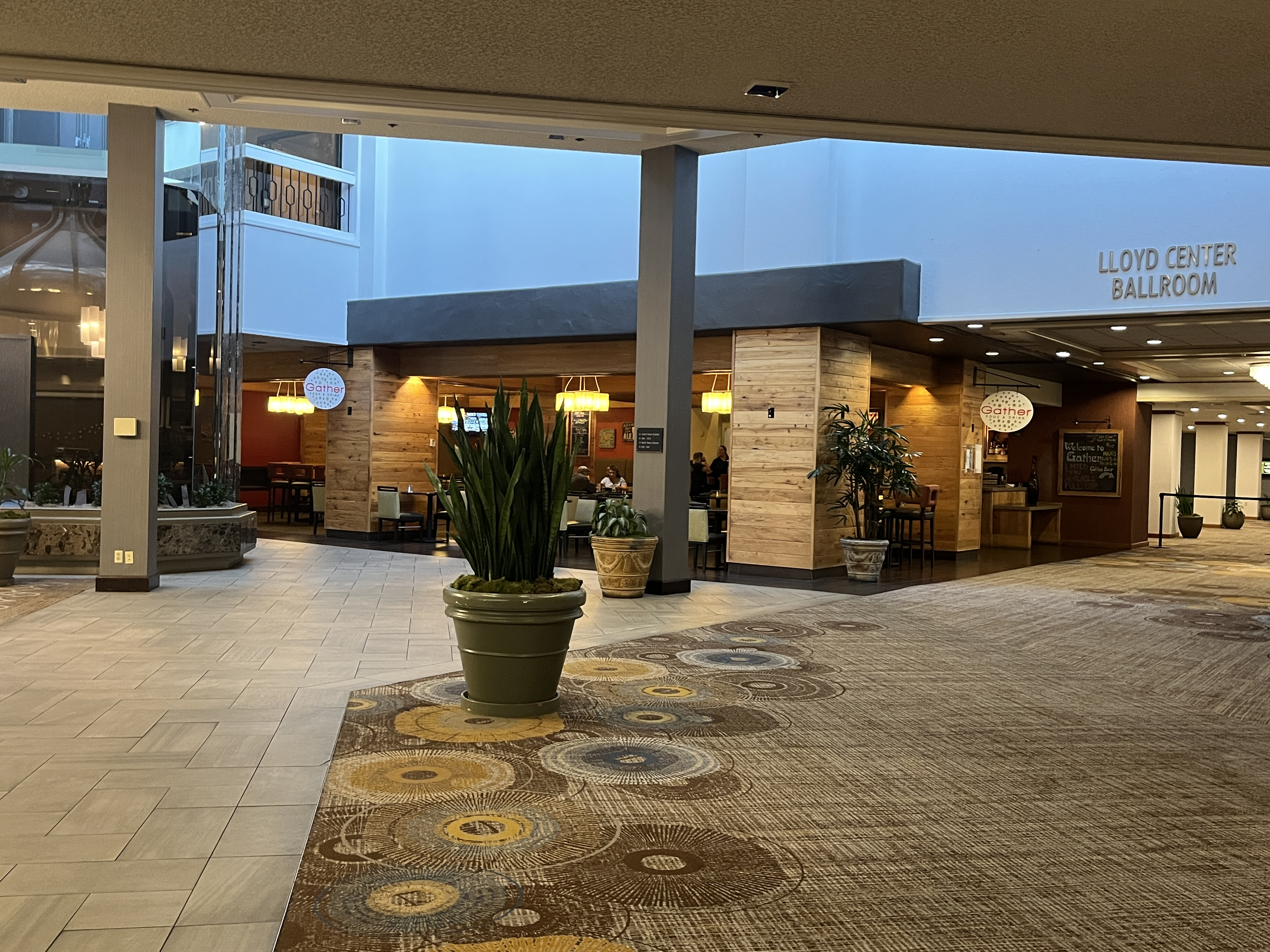
The hotel's interior, 2022

Lizzy Acker included the property in The Oregonian's 2016 list of Portland's best outdoor hotel pools. In 2017, the newspaper's Grant Butler included the DoubleTree by Hilton Hotel in a list of "38 landmark Portland hotels that offer a window into Rose City's history, growth". He wrote:

The recently renovated DoubleTree Hotel in the Lloyd District may seem like just another link in the Hilton's chain of hotels catering to corporate travelers. But it played a crucial role in the development of Portland's eastside when it first opened in 1959 as the Sheraton-Portland. The nine-story hotel featured 300 rooms, and cost $6 million to complete. Because of its location directly across Northeast Multnomah from Lloyd Center, the hotel catered to shoppers drawn to the then-outdoor shopping mall, which was one of the first of its kind in the nation.

Fodor's has said, "This bustling, business hotel maintains a steady customer base in meetings and special events, so you will find all the usual business-friendly perks and luxuries .... The large rooms, many with balconies, are well maintained, and many of those on the upper floors have views of the city and—on clear days—the mountains." Deanna deBara of Fodor's has rated the hotel four out of five stars. One guide by Moon Publications said "The best thing about this Lloyd District hotel is its location (and the warm chocolate chip cookies at check-in) .... The rooms are, for the most part, spacious, clean, and comfortable."
