= SERA Architects =

SERA Architects, Inc.
- Company type: Private, Incorporation (business); Employee stock ownership plan
- Industry: Architecture, Interior design and Urban planning
- Founded: 1968
- Founders: Bing Sheldon
- Headquarters: Former Minnesota Hotel, Portland, Oregon, United States; 45°31′32.4″N 122°40′31.2″W
- Revenue: $23.7 million
- Number of employees: 130
- Website: www.seradesign.com

SERA Architects is an American architectural firm headquartered in Portland, Oregon, with a second office in Oakland, California. It is the fifth largest architecture firm in Portland, offering architectural, interior design, and urban design and planning services. Founded in Portland in 1968 by architect Bing Sheldon, who led the Portland Downtown Plan to revitalize the city’s urban core, the firm’s early work focused on historic renovations and adaptive reuse projects. In 2015, SERA opened a second office in Mountain View, California.

The firm is known for its research and implementation of sustainable design. In 2014 and 2015, two of its projects were named among the top ten greenest in the U.S. by the American Institute of Architects.
