= Campbell Hotel =

Historic building in Portland, Oregon, United States

- U.S. National Register of Historic Places
- U.S. Historic district – Contributing property
- Portland Historic Landmark
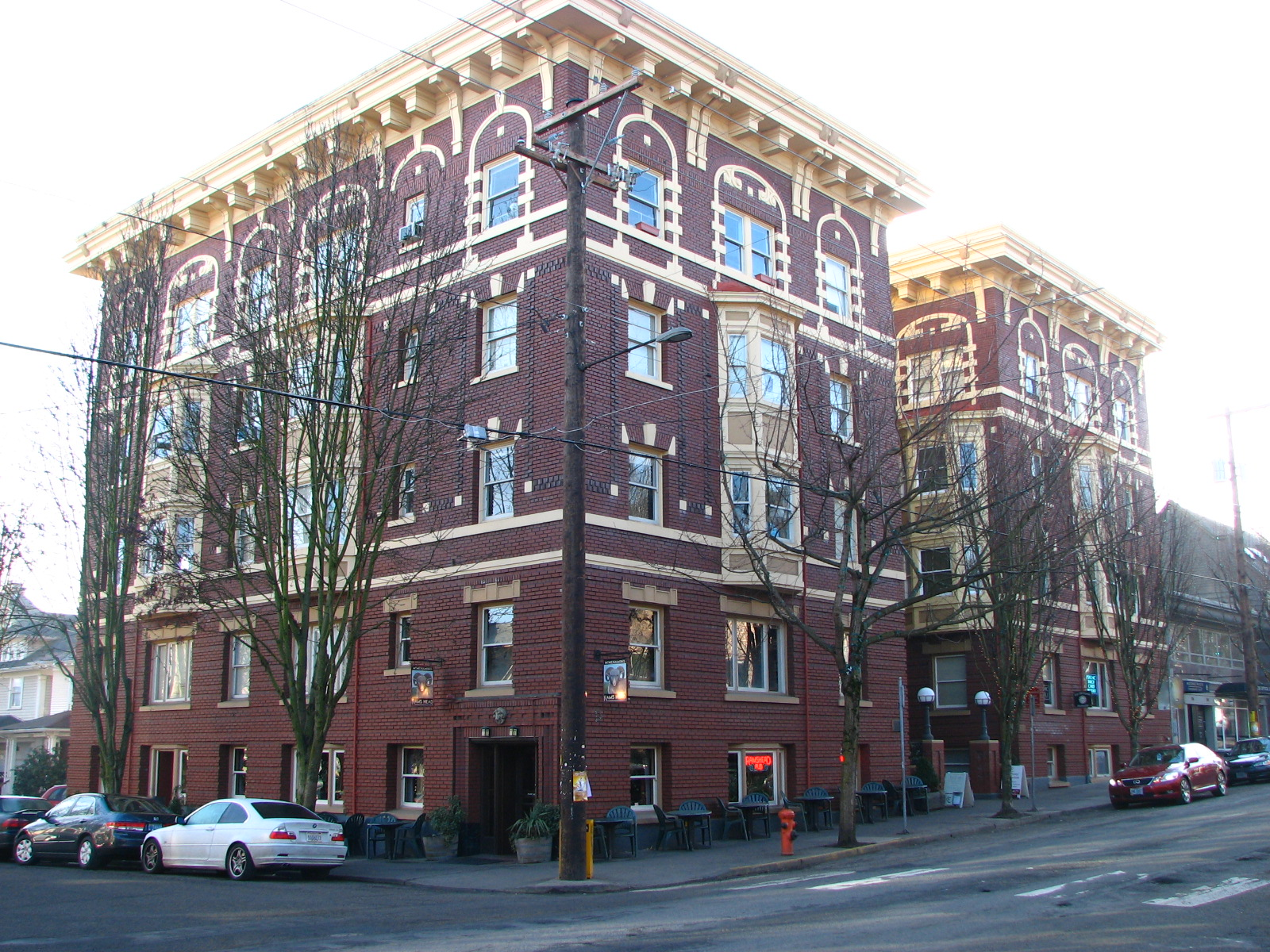
- Campbell Hotel in 2009

- Location within Portland, Oregon
- Location: 530 NW 23rd Avenue; Portland, Oregon
- Coordinates: 45°31′36″N 122°41′54″W
- Built: 1912
- Architect: Alexander C. Ewart
- Architectural style: Colonial Revival, Georgian Revival
- Part of: Alphabet Historic District (ID00001293)
- NRHP reference No.: 88000098
- Added to NRHP: February 22, 1988

The Campbell Hotel, located in northwest Portland, Oregon, is a historic former residential hotel that is listed on the National Register of Historic Places (NRHP). It is now an apartment building named the Campbell Court Apartments.

== See also ==
- National Register of Historic Places listings in Northwest Portland, Oregon
