= List of Marriott hotels =

The company known as Marriott Hotels & Resorts is a large, American-based hotel chain that has multiple hotels worldwide. Here is a list of the locations and number of hotels in each country and city.

== Location of international properties ==
Country	Hotels	Cities
Albania	1	Tirana
Algeria	2	Bab Ezzouar, Constantine
Argentina	1	Buenos Aires
Armenia	2	Tsaghkadzor, Yerevan
Azerbaijan	1	Baku
Aruba	1	Palm Beach
Australia	4	Brisbane, Melbourne (2), Sydney Adelaide
Austria	1	Vienna
Belgium	2	Brussels, Ghent
Belarus	1	Minsk
Bolivia	1	Santa Cruz de la Sierra
Bosnia and Herzegovina	2	Sarajevo
Brazil	1	Guarulhos
Canada	16	Calgary (2), Dorval, Halifax, Markham, Montreal, Niagara Falls (2), Ottawa, Quebec City, Richmond, Toronto (3), Vancouver, Victoria
Cayman Islands	1	Grand Cayman
Chile	1	Santiago
China	57	Baotou, Beijing (3), Changzhou (2), Chengdu, Chongqing, Foshan (2), Fuzhou, Guangzhou (3), Haikou, Hangzhou (2), Jiaxing, Jinhua, Lingshui, Liyang, Nanjing, Nanning, Nantong, Ningbo, Qinhuangdao, Sanya, Shanghai (7), Shenyang, Shenzhen (2), Suining, Suzhou (2), Taizhou, Tianjin, Wenzhou (2), Wuhan (2), Wuxi, Xiamen (2), Xinzhou, Xuzhou, Yancheng, Yantai, Yiwu, Zhangjiagang, Zhuhai, Zhuzhou
Colombia	5	Barranquilla, Bogotá, Cali, Medellín, Santa Marta
Costa Rica	2	Heredia, Herradura
Curaçao	1	Willemstad
Czech Republic	1	Prague
Denmark	1	Copenhagen
Egypt	3	Cairo (2), Hurghada
Fiji	1	Nadi
France	6	Cap d'Ail, Lyon, Paris (3), Roissy-en-France
Ghana	1	Accra
(Georgia (country)) Georgia	1	Tbilisi
Germany	12	Berlin, Bonn, Cologne, Frankfurt (2), Freising, Hamburg, Heidelberg, Leipzig, Munich (2), Sindelfingen
Greece	1	Athens
Guyana	1	Georgetown
Haiti	1	Port-au-Prince
Hong Kong	2	Hong Kong (2)
Hungary	1	Budapest
India	17	Bengaluru, Goa, Chandigarh, Hyderabad, Indore, Jaipur, Jaisalmer, Katra, Kochi, Kolkata, Madikeri [Coorg], Mumbai, Mussoorie, Nainital [Jim Corbett National Park], New Delhi, Pune, Surat
Indonesia	2	Batam, Yogyakarta
Italy	3	Milan, Rome (2)
Japan	8	Izu, Karuizawa, Moriyama, Nagoya, Osaka, Shirahama, Tokyo, Yamanakako
Jordan	3	Amman, Dead Sea, Petra
Kazakhstan	1	Astana
Malaysia	4	Kota Kinabalu, Miri, Mulu, Sepang
Malta	1	St. Julian's
Mexico	11	Aguascalientes, Cancún, Culiacán, Ixtapan de la Sal, Mexico City, Puebla, Puerto Vallarta, Tijuana, Torreón, Tuxtla Gutiérrez, Villahermosa
Morocco	3	Casablanca, Fez, Rabat
Nepal	1	Kathmandu
Netherlands	3	Amsterdam, Rotterdam, The Hague
Nigeria	1	Lagos
North Macedonia	1	Skopje
Pakistan	2	Islamabad, Karachi
Panama	1	Panama City
Philippines	2	Clark, Manila
Poland	2	Sopot, Warsaw
Portugal	2	Lisbon, Óbidos
Puerto Rico	1	San Juan
Qatar	1	Doha
Rwanda	1	Kigali
Saudi Arabia	5	Jeddah, Makkah, Riyadh (3)
Singapore	1	Singapore
South Africa	2	Cape Town, Johannesburg
South Korea	2	Daegu, Jeju
Spain	2	Dénia, Madrid
Sri Lanka	2	Weligama, Colombo
(Saint Kitts and Nevis) St. Kitts and Nevis	1	Frigate Bay
Switzerland	3	Basel, Geneva, Zurich
Taiwan	2	Taipei, Kaohsiung
Thailand	7	Bangkok (3), Hua Hin, Phuket (2), Rayong
Tunisia	2	Sousse, Tunis
Turkey	9	Istanbul (4), İzmir, Ankara, Bodrum, Antalya, Erzurum
United Arab Emirates	5	Abu Dhabi (2), Dubai (3)
United Kingdom	21	Bournemouth, Bristol, Cardiff, Glasgow, Hayes, Hertfordshire, Leeds, Leicester, Lingfield, London (8), Manchester, Portsmouth, Twickenham, Swansea
Venezuela	2	Catia La Mar, Maracay
Vietnam	1	Da Nang

== Location of properties in the US ==
State	Hotels	Cities
Alabama	6	Birmingham, Florence, Huntsville, Mobile, Opelika, Prattville
Alaska	1	Anchorage
Arizona	6	Chandler, Phoenix, Scottsdale (2), Tempe, Tucson
Arkansas	1	Little Rock
California	42	Anaheim, Bakersfield, Buellton, Burbank, Burlingame, Coronado, Costa Mesa, Dana Point, Fremont, Fullerton, Garden Grove, Irvine (2), La Jolla, Long Beach, Los Angeles (2), Marina del Rey, Monterey, Napa, Newport Beach (2), Oakland, Pleasanton, Rancho Cordova, Riverside, San Diego (4), San Francisco (3), San Jose, San Mateo, San Ramon, Santa Clara, Torrance, Ventura, Visalia, Walnut Creek, Woodland Hills
Colorado	9	Aurora, Boulder, Colorado Springs, Denver, Fort Collins, Golden, Lone Tree, Vail, Westminster
Connecticut	6	Farmington, Groton, Hartford, Stamford, Trumbull, Windsor
(Washington, D.C.) District of Columbia	4	Washington, D.C. (4)
Florida	28	Boca Raton, Clearwater Beach, Coral Springs, Fort Lauderdale (2), Fort Myers, Hollywood, Jacksonville, Key Largo, Key West, Lake Mary, Miami (3), Miami Beach, Orlando (3), Palm Beach Gardens, Pompano, Ponte Vedra Beach, Riviera Beach, Saint Petersburg, Stuart, Tampa (3), West Palm Beach
(Georgia (U.S. state)) Georgia	14	Alpharetta, Atlanta (8), Augusta, Columbus, Macon, Peachtree Corners, Savannah, Stone Mountain (2)
Hawaii	4	Honolulu, Lihue, Waikoloa, Wailea
Illinois	16	Burr Ridge, Chicago (5), Deerfield, Downers Grove, Hoffman Estates, Lincolnshire, Naperville, Normal, Oak Brook, Peoria, Rosemont, Schaumburg
Indiana	3	Indianapolis (3)
Iowa	3	Cedar Rapids, Des Moines, West Des Moines
Kansas	2	Overland Park, Wichita
Kentucky	6	Covington, Hebron, Lexington (2), Louisville (2)
Louisiana	4	Baton Rouge, Metairie, New Orleans (2)
Maryland	8	Baltimore (2), Bethesda (2), Gaithersburg, Hyattsville, Linthicum, Rockville
Massachusetts	7	Boston (2), Burlington, Cambridge, Newton, Peabody, Quincy
Michigan	9	Dearborn, Detroit, East Lansing, Livonia, Pontiac, Romulus, Southfield, Troy, Ypsilanti
Minnesota	6	Bloomington, Brooklyn Park, Minneapolis (2), Minnetonka, Rochester
Missouri	6	Kansas City (3), St. Louis (3)
Nebraska	4	Lincoln, Omaha (2), South Sioux City
Nevada	1	Las Vegas
New Hampshire	1	New Castle
New Jersey	7	Bridgewater, Newark, Park Ridge, Princeton, Saddle Brook, Teaneck, Whippany
New Mexico	2	Albuquerque (2)
(New York (state)) New York	13	Albany, Amherst, Brooklyn, Buffalo, East Elmhurst, Ithaca, Melville, New York (2), Rochester, Syracuse, Tarrytown, Uniondale
North Carolina	9	Charlotte (2), Durham (2), Greensboro (2), Raleigh (2), Winston-Salem
Ohio	8	Cleveland, Columbus (2), Dayton, Dublin, Mason, Warrensville Heights, West Chester
Oklahoma	1	Tulsa
Oregon	2	Portland (2)
Pennsylvania	8	Coraopolis, Cranberry Township, Lancaster, Philadelphia (3), Pittsburgh, West Conshohocken
Rhode Island	2	Providence, Newport
South Carolina	7	Charleston, Columbia, Greenville, Hilton Head, Myrtle Beach, North Charleston, Spartanburg
Tennessee	6	Chattanooga, Franklin, Kingsport, Memphis, Nashville (2)
Texas	28	Austin, Dallas (3), El Paso, Fort Worth (2), Houston (8), Irving (2), Odessa, Plano, Round Rock, San Antonio (4), Spring, Sugar Land, The Woodlands, Westlake
Utah	4	Provo, Salt Lake City (3)
Virginia	15	Arlington (3), Chantilly, Dulles, Fairfax, Falls Church, Glen Allen, Herndon, Hume, Newport News, Norfolk, Richmond, Tysons Corner, Virginia Beach
(Washington (state)) Washington	5	Bellevue, Redmond, Seattle (2), Tacoma
West Virginia	2	Charleston, Morgantown
Wisconsin	3	Middleton, Milwaukee, Waukesha

== Properties by country ==
=== Aruba ===
- Aruba Marriott Resort & Stellaris Casino

=== Armenia ===
- Armenia Marriott Hotel Yerevan

=== Canada ===
- The Algonquin Resort St. Andrews By-The-Sea
- Château Champlain

=== Taiwan ===
- Marriott Taipei

=== Thailand ===
- Bangkok Marriott Hotel The Surawongse

=== United Arab Emirates ===
- Dubai Marriott Harbour Hotel & Suites

=== United Kingdom ===
- Breadsall Priory
- Hanbury Manor
- Marriott London Park Lane
- Cardiff Marriott Hotel

=== United States ===
- Atlanta Marriott Marquis
- Indianapolis Marriott Downtown
- Des Moines Marriott Hotel
- Algonquin Hotel
- HarborCenter
- LECOM Harborcenter
- The Bidwell Marriott Portland
- Portland Marriott Downtown Waterfront
- Salt Lake Marriott Downtown at City Creek
- Alaska Building
