= Scenic Hill Tunnel =

Coordinates: 22.292738°N 113.932910°E

Scenic Hill Tunnel 觀景山隧道
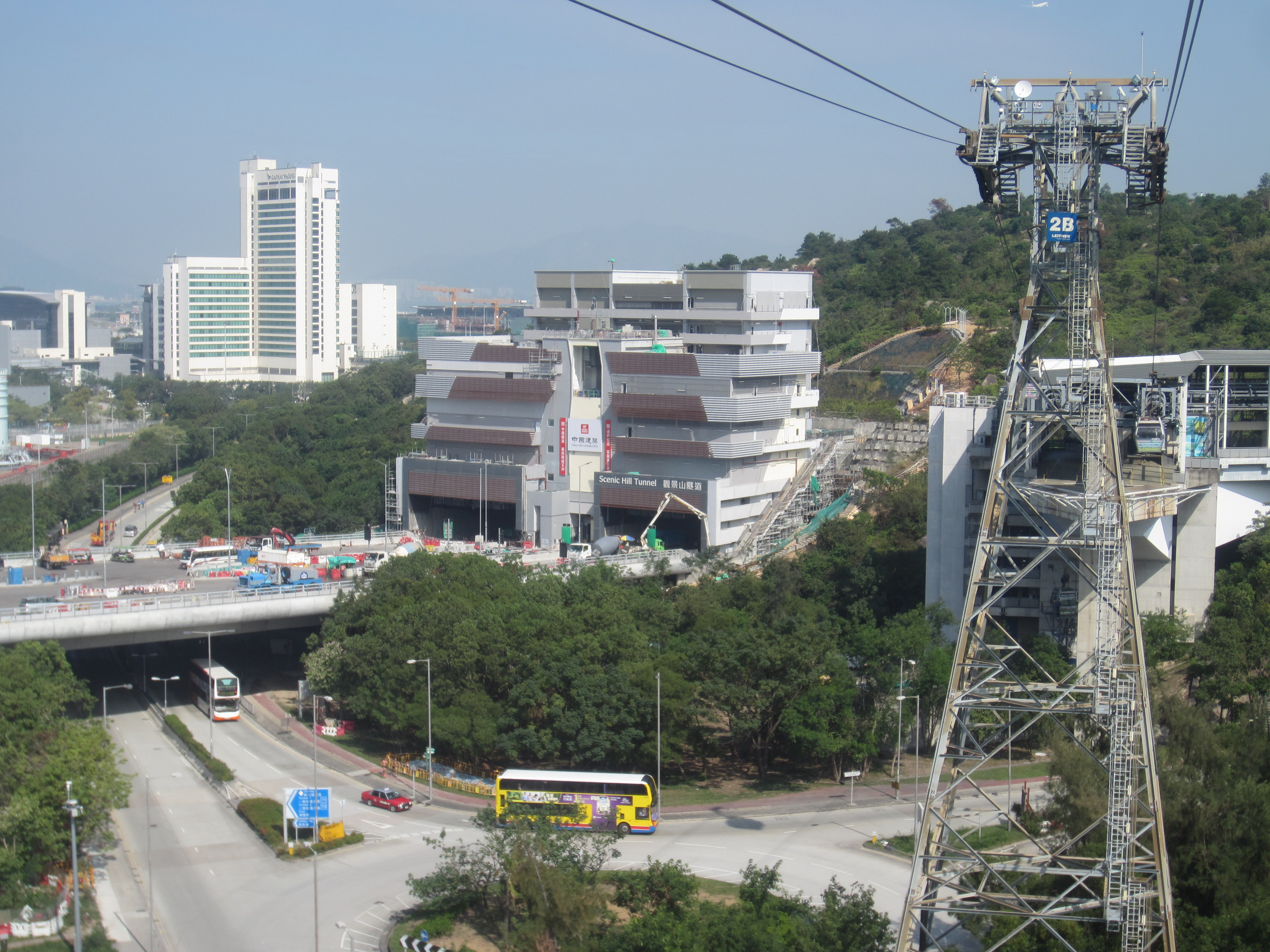
- West end of the Scenic Hill Tunnel in November 2017
- Interactive map of Scenic Hill Tunnel 觀景山隧道

Overview
- Status: Open
- Start: Islands District, Chek Lap Kok, Scenic Road and Chek Lap Kok North Road intersection
- End: Islands District, Airport Island New Reclamation Area

Operation
- Work began: 31 May 2012; 14 years ago
- Opened: 24 October 2018; 7 years ago
- Owner: Hong Kong Government
- Toll: Free (Note: Although the tunnel itself is free of charge, the main bridge is a toll road)

Technical
- Length: 1.1 kilometres (0.68 mi)
- No. of lanes: 7 lanes (3 lanes eastbound and 4 lanes westbound)
- Operating speed: 80 kilometres per hour (50 mph)

Scenic Hill Tunnel (Chinese: 觀景山隧道) is a road tunnel located on the Hong Kong–Zhuhai–Macau Bridge, in Scenic Hill, Chek Lap Kok, Lantau Island, Hong Kong. The west exit of the tunnel is near the Ngong Ping 360 Airport Island Angle Station and the fuel storage centre. It runs through Scenic Hill and along the current Airport Road and under the MTR Airport Express lines, and passes through the new reclamation areas, connecting the Hong Kong road sections and the Hong Kong–Zhuhai–Macau Bridge port.

== About ==
The plan for the tunnel started in 2011 and began construction on 31 May 2012. The cost of the tunnel was 88.8 billion Hong Kong dollars.

The contractor for the tunnel was China State Construction Engineering.

The tunnel was opened on 24 October 2018, along with the Hong Kong–Zhuhai–Macau Bridge. It is the only tunnel in Hong Kong that drives on the right, and is also the widest tunnel with the most lanes in Hong Kong, having seven lanes (three eastbound and four southbound).

Although using the Scenic View Tunnel is not charged, its charge is included in the toll fees by using the bridge.
