= Marriott Hotels & Resorts =

Flagship brand of Marriott International

- Type: Subsidiary
- Industry: Hospitality
- Founded: 1957; 69 years ago
- Founder: J. Willard Marriott
- Headquarters: Bethesda, Maryland, U.S.
- Number of locations: 608 (January 2025)
- Area served: Worldwide
- Parent: Marriott International
- Website: www.marriott.com

Marriott Hotels & Resorts is Marriott International's brand of full-service hotels and resorts based in Bethesda, Maryland. As of June 30, 2020, there were 582 hotels and resorts with 205,053 rooms operating under the brand, in addition to 160 hotels with 47,765 rooms planned for development.

== History ==
=== Foundation and early years ===
The Marriott hotel chain began when the Hot Shoppes, Inc. restaurant company decided to diversify into hotels. Its first hotel opened in 1957 in Virginia, the Marriott Motor Hotel, adjacent to The Pentagon and Washington National Airport. The company's second hotel was the nearby Marriott Key Bridge Motor Hotel, which opened in 1959. This was soon followed by Marriott Motor Hotels in Dallas in 1960, Philadelphia in 1961, Atlanta in 1965, and Saddle Brook, New Jersey in 1966.

Hot Shoppes, Inc. was renamed the Marriott Corporation in 1967, by which point it was operating 8 hotels.

In 1967, Marriott acquired its first resort hotel, the historic Camelback Inn in Arizona, United States. In 1969, the Paraiso Marriott, the first international Marriott Hotel, opened in Acapulco, Mexico. That same year, Marriott bought the famed Essex House overlooking Central Park in New York City.

In 1972, the Marriott lodging division acquired the Greek-based Sun Line cruise line, which it owned until 1987.

In 1975, Marriott Hotels & Resorts expanded to Europe, with the opening of the Amsterdam Marriott. In 1980, Marriott opened its first hotel in the Middle East, the Riyadh Marriott, in Saudi Arabia. The Cairo Marriott followed in 1981, the chain's first hotel in Africa.

In these first several decades, Marriott International owned and managed many of the hotels within its portfolio. In 1993, the company decided to spin off the real estate ownership operations as a new company, Host Marriott, while retaining hotel management services under the Marriott International company name.

=== Development since 2000 ===
By 1999, there were over 360 Marriott Hotels & Resorts in 47 countries, and in November 2010, Marriott Hotels & Resorts announced the opening of what is said was their 500th property, the Pune Marriott Hotel & Convention Centre, in Pune, India. In September 2005, Marriott Hotels & Resorts unveiled its first new room designs in ten years. Dubbed "mSpot", the new rooms feature clean lines and updated technology.

In 2013, Marriott committed to transitioning to cage-free eggs at all properties. In 2018, the company renewed its pledge to eliminate eggs from caged hens by 2025. Marriott released an update concerning the status of its commitment in May 2025, which noted that by year-end 2024, 92% of egg purchases in managed hotels were cage-free. However, only 64% of global purchases at managed hotels and 47% of purchases by franchised properties in the U.S., Canada, and the Caribbean and Latin America were cage-free at that time. In their statement, Marriott cited challenges related to avian flu-induced supply chain dynamics. In response, activist groups staged numerous protests globally, which included disrupting the speaking events of Marriott executives and creating "a website that featured grotesque AI-generated images of Marriott International CEO Anthony Capuano surrounded by bloody feathers and dead chickens."

In August 2020, Marriott announced it was ending its Make A Green Choice program. In October 2020, the UK data privacy watchdog fined Marriott Hotels £18.4 million for a serious data breach that exposed the millions of the companies customer's data to cyber-criminals.

In July 2022, The Marriott Hotel revealed that the company's data had been breached. Hackers were able to compromise the hotels' data which led to 20GB of data which included internal documents and information in addition to consumer data such as credit card information. The hackers broke into a server at the Marriott Hotel at Baltimore-Washington International Airport. The group shared screenshots of customer information and were in contact with the Hotel chain. This data breach marks the third data breach for the company in the last 4 years.

In 2023, a criminal investigation was opened against Marriott in Poland, claiming that it acted fraudulently and unethically against the Lim company, the owner of a Warsaw hotel. During the COVID-19 period, Marriott would not keep up the hotel's maintenance and shifted the costs of maintaining the empty hotel to the Lim Company. At the same time Marriott prevented the Lim Company from renting the hotel to the National Health Fund for doctors' housing or contracting for advertising deals until the Lim Company would pay unwarranted bonuses to Marriott.

== Accommodations ==
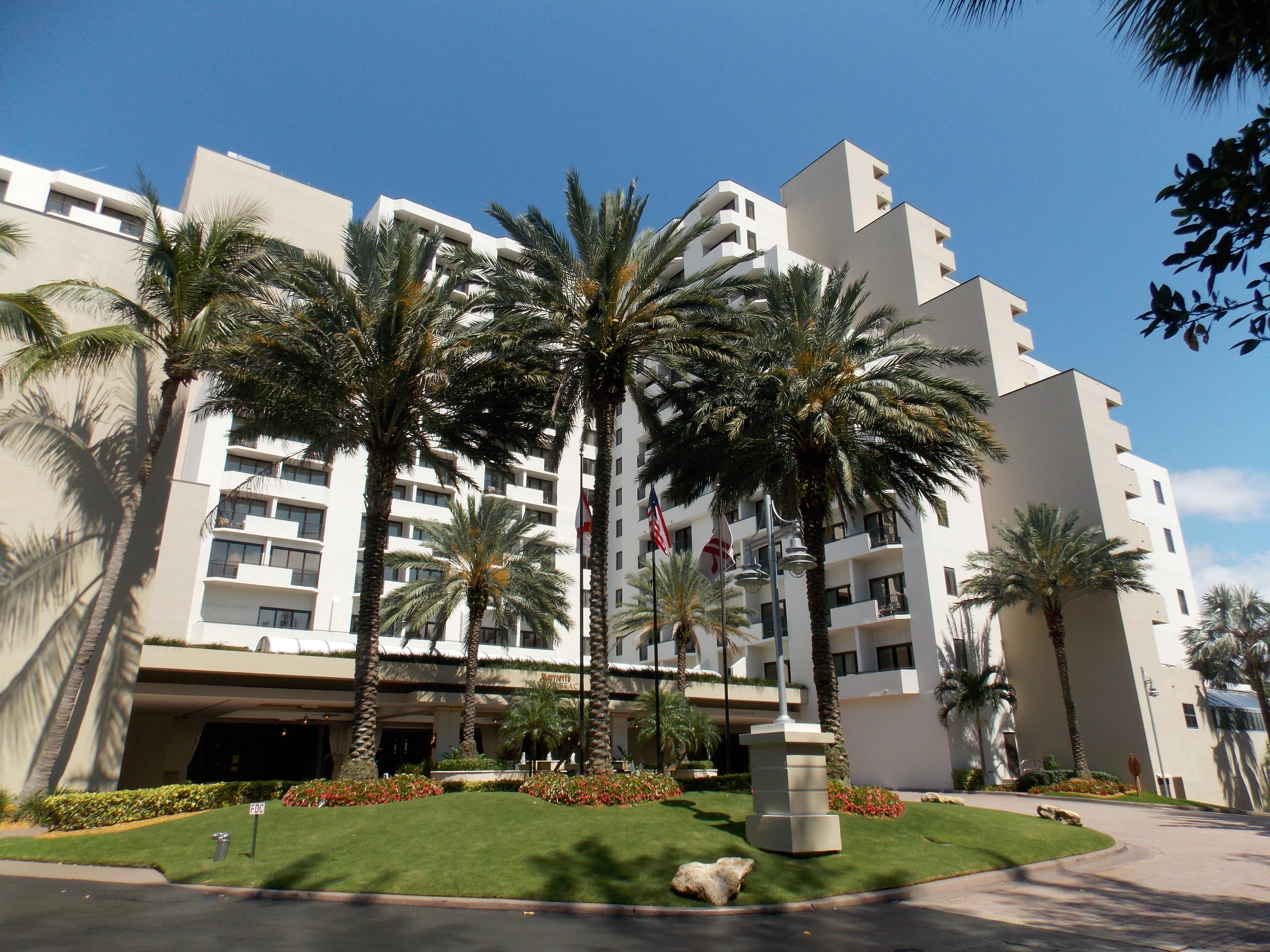
Marriott Hotel in Fort Lauderdale

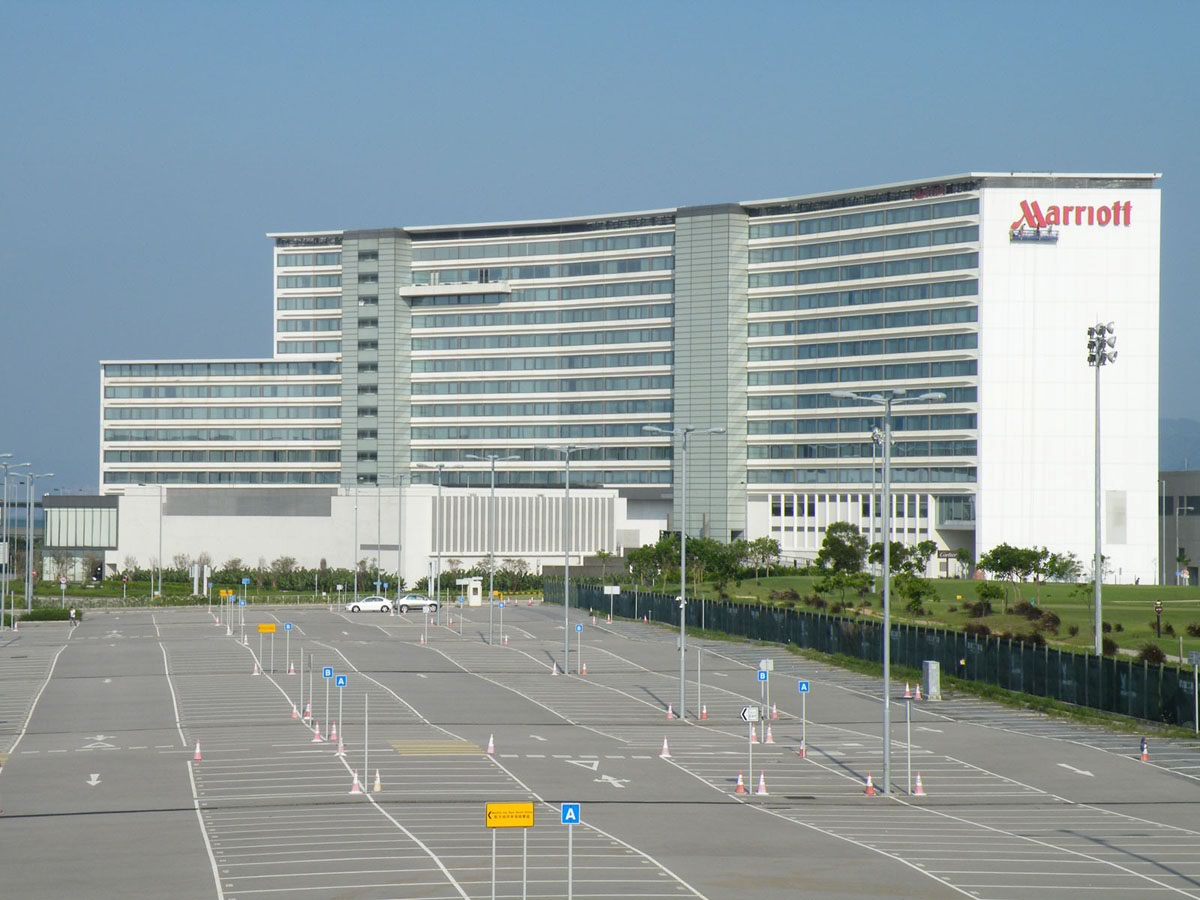
Marriott Hotel in Hong Kong

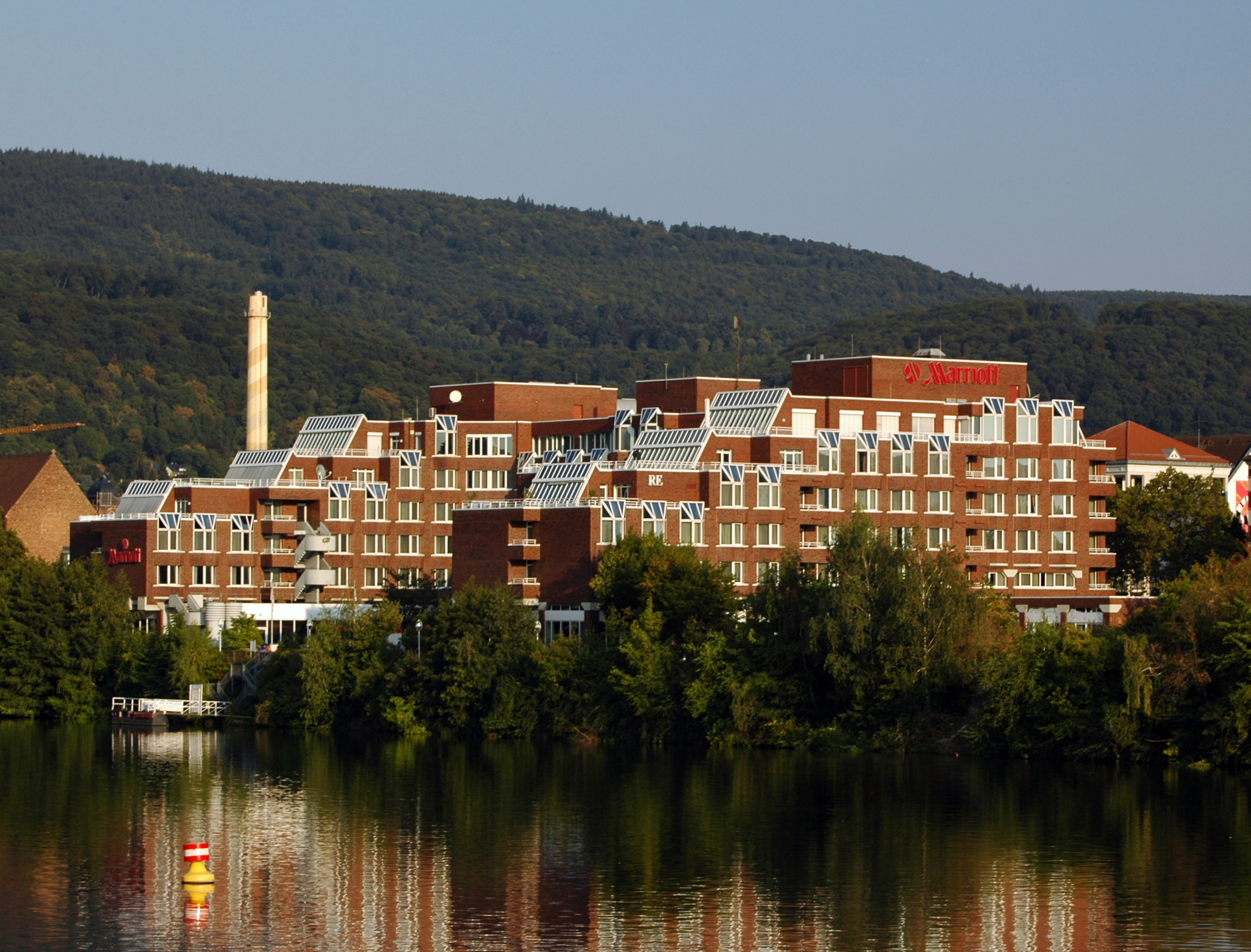
Marriott Hotel in Heidelberg

=== Historical ===
		US	Non-US	Total
2006	Properties			470
2006	Rooms			168,383
2007	Properties	313	156	469
2007	Rooms	124,584	43,952	168,536
2008	Properties	321	157	478
2008	Rooms	127,192	45,409	172,601
2009	Properties	326	165	491
2009	Rooms	128,628	48,421	177,049
2010	Properties	326	168	494
2010	Rooms	128,916	49,818	178,734
2011	Properties	322	170	492
2011	Rooms	127,826	51,028	178,854
2012	Properties	320	169	489
2012	Rooms	126,113	50,096	176,209
2013	Properties	312	174	486
2013	Rooms	123,296	51,213	174,509
2014	Properties	314	185	499
2014	Rooms	124,686	54,535	179,221

=== From 2015 ===
		North America	Europe	Middle E. & Africa	Asia & Pacific	Caribbean Latin Am.	Total
2015	Properties	342	94	18	45	27	526
2015	Rooms	134,425	23,071	6,206	15,804	7,771	187,277
2016	Properties	345	97	20	58	26	546
2016	Rooms	135,813	23,872	6,809	20,286	7,516	194,296
2017	Properties	347	98	22	70	29	566
2017	Rooms	137,333	24,069	7,389	23,479	8,010	200,280
2018	Properties	341	94	24	80	28	567
2018	Rooms	134,834	23,969	8,061	26,962	7,540	201,366
2019	Properties	340	97	25	83	30	575
2019	Rooms	134,412	24,595	8,119	28,000	8,033	203,159
2020	Properties	340	100	26	90	29	585
2020	Rooms	133,972	25,946	8,110	30,008	7,789	205,825
2021	Properties	340	103	26	96	29	594
2021	Rooms	132,791	26,719	7,968	32,119	7,789	207,386
2022	Properties	339	75	28	102	31	575
2022	Rooms	132,960	21,454	8,726	33,992	8,311	205,443
2023	Properties	337	77	29	112	32	587
2023	Rooms	132,856	21,990	9,083	37,674	8,461	210,064

== Notable properties ==
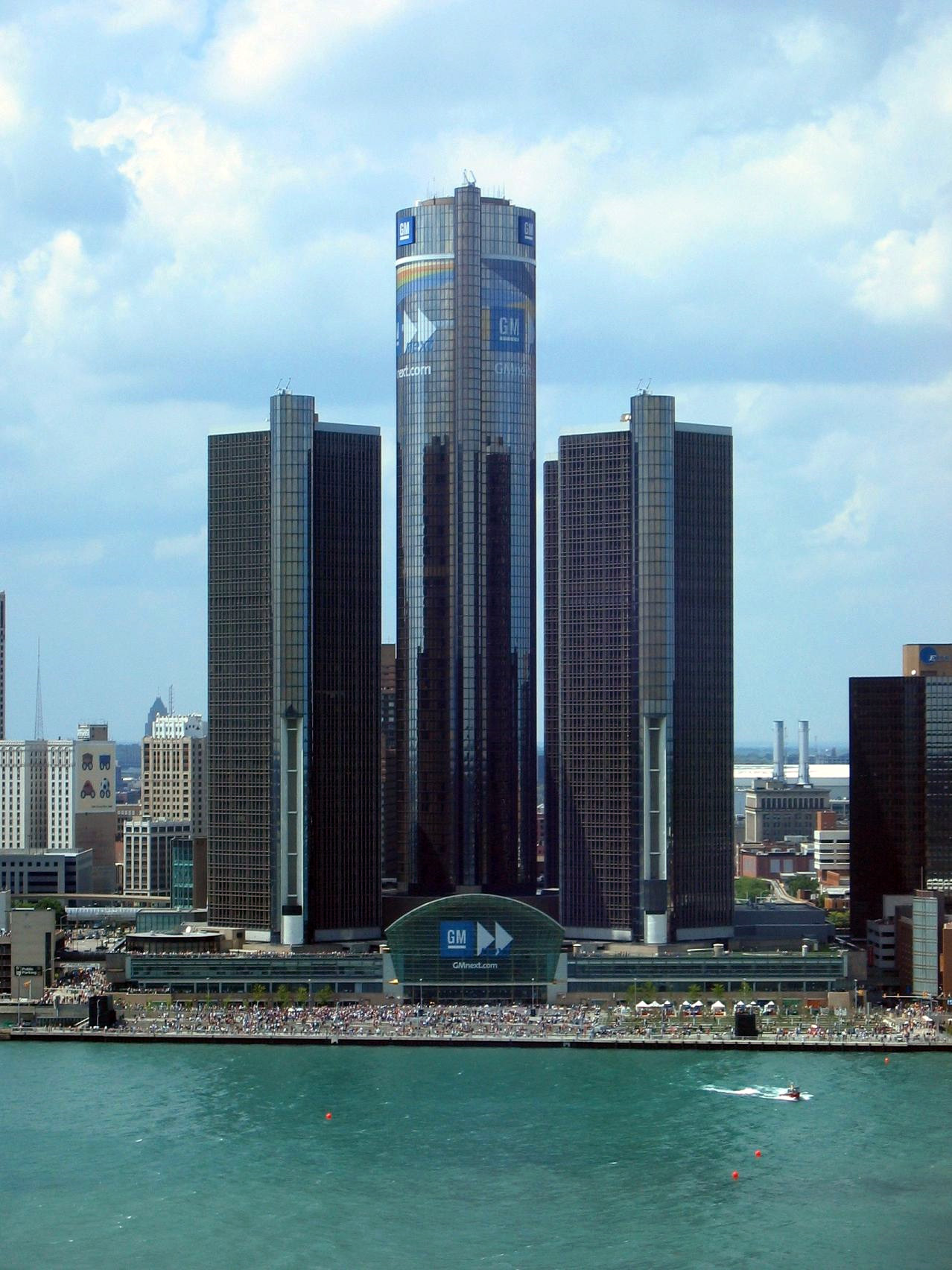
The Detroit Marriott at the Renaissance Center is the tallest hotel in the Western Hemisphere.

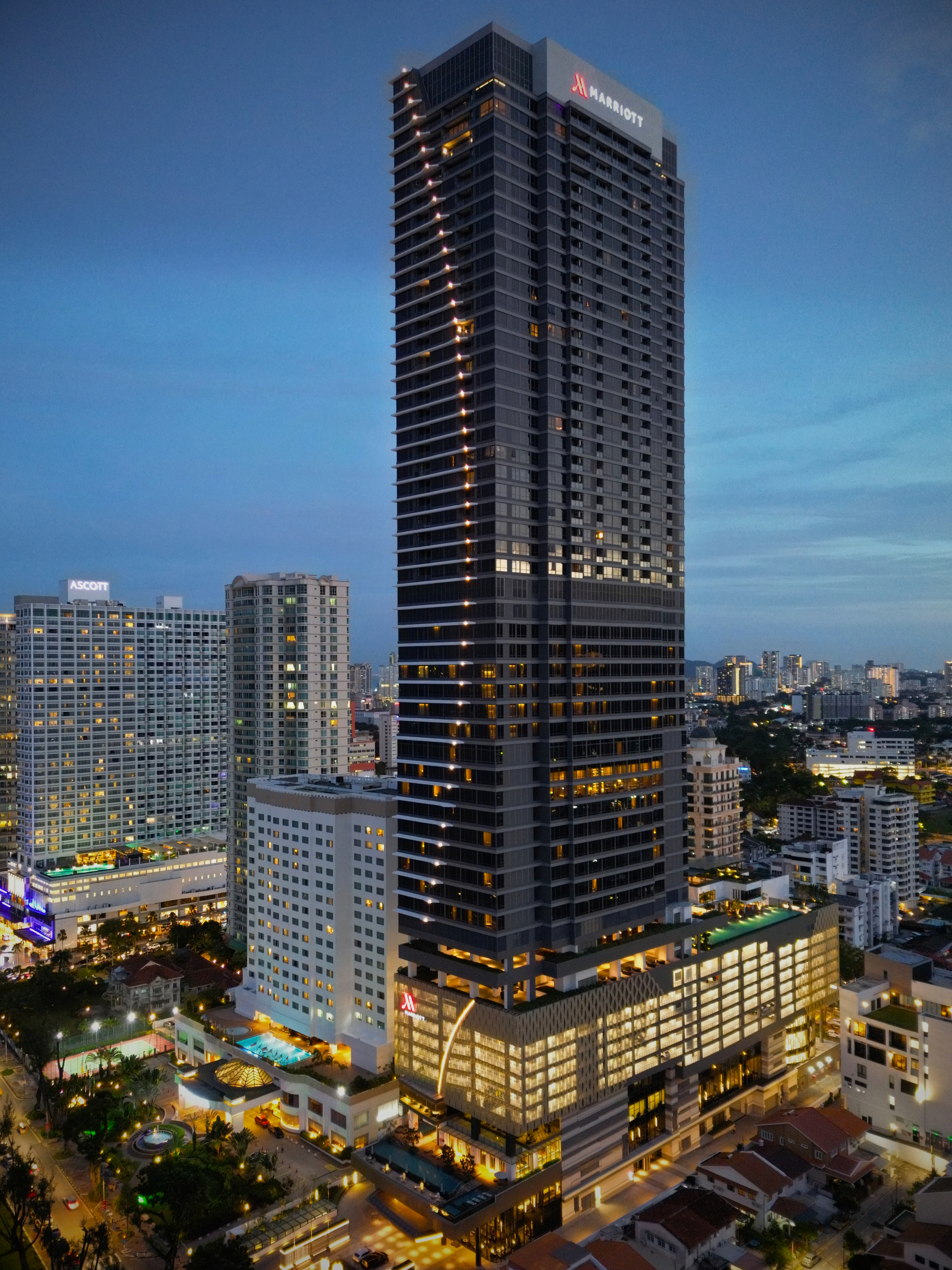
The Marriott Residences Penang is one of the tallest skyscrapers in the city of George Town, Malaysia.

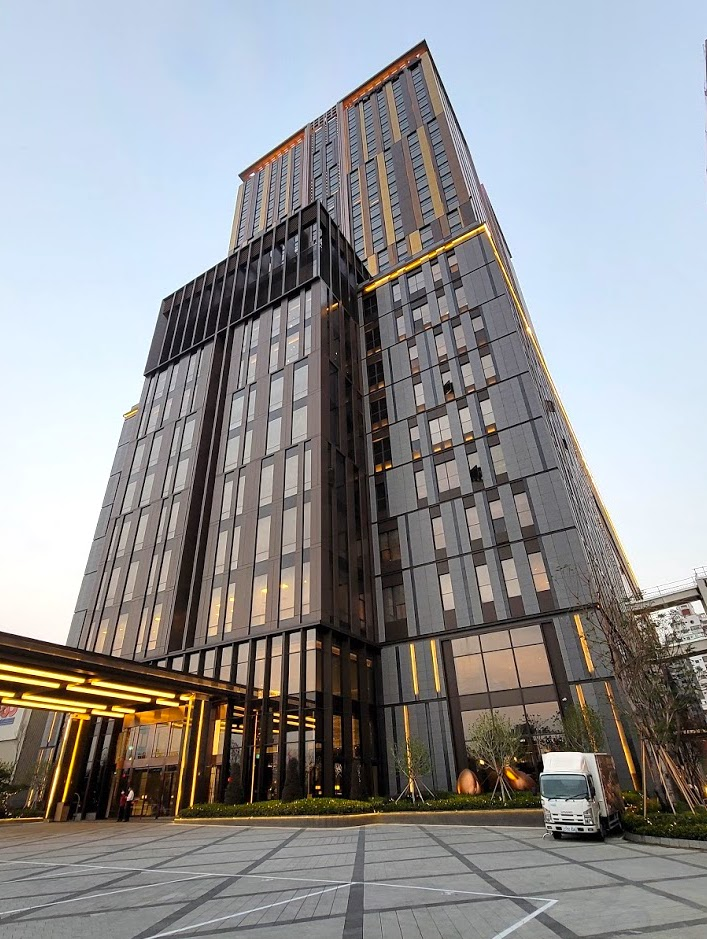
Kaohsiung Marriott Hotel in Taiwan is the largest Marriott hotel in Asia with 700 rooms.

- Arlington, Virginia, United States: The Marriott Motor Hotel Twin Bridges was the first lodging establishment opened by J. Willard Marriott, on January 16, 1957. It closed in 1988 and has since been demolished.
- Atlanta, Georgia, United States: The Atlanta Marriott Marquis had the largest hotel atrium in the world when it first opened in 1985 (its record has been surpassed by the Burj Al Arab). It was designed by architect John C. Portman Jr.
- Baltimore, Maryland, United States: The Baltimore Marriott Waterfront Hotel is the tallest hotel in Baltimore.
- Bangkok, Thailand: The Bangkok Marriott Hotel The Surawongse was opened in 2018.
- Buffalo, New York, United States: The LECOM Harborcenter is a mixed-use development that contains the 205-key Buffalo Marriott at LECOM Harborcenter.
- Cairo, Egypt: The Marriott Mena House Hotel is part of a historic accommodation located to the north of the Giza pyramid complex, providing direct views of the monuments. Originally a hunting lodge built in 1869 for the Isma'il Pasha of Egypt, it became a hotel called The Mena House in 1886, named after Pharaoh Menes. In 1977, Egyptian and Israeli diplomats sat down at the hotel to negotiate a settlement that would produce the Camp David Accords, which returned the Sinai Peninsula to Egypt. In 2018, Marriott began managing the garden wing of the hotel as a Marriott, while the palace wing is planned to be transformed into a JW Marriott.
- Cardiff, United Kingdom: The Cardiff Marriott Hotel is located near the Cardiff Central Library. Marriott began managing the hotel in 1992, prior to which it was operated as a Holiday Inn.
- Casablanca, Morocco: The former Sheraton Casablanca Hotel & Towers was rebranded Casablanca Marriott Hotel after a renovation in 2022.
- Chicago, Illinois, United States: The Marriott Marquis Chicago is connected to the McCormick Place, the largest convention center in North America, via a footbridge.
- Constantine, Algeria: The Constantine Marriott Hotel is designed after the Moorish style.
- Des Moines, Iowa, United States: The Des Moines Marriott Hotel is the tallest hotel in the state of Iowa.
- Detroit, Michigan, United States: The Detroit Marriott at the Renaissance Center is housed in the tallest skyscraper of the Renaissance Center, located on the Detroit International Riverfront and owned by General Motors.
- Dubai, United Arab Emirates: The Dubai Marriott Harbour Hotel & Suites, opened in 2007, became a Marriott in 2009. It is located in the Dubai Marina.
- George Town, Malaysia: The Marriott Residences Penang is the second tallest skyscraper in the city.
- Hong Kong, China: The Hong Kong SkyCity entertainment complex, neighboring the Hong Kong International Airport, includes the Hong Kong SkyCity Marriott Hotel, notable for being the first hotel in the city to receive halal food certification.
- Houston, Texas, United States: The Marriott Marquis Houston is connected to the George R. Brown Convention Center by a sky bridge.
- Indianapolis, Indiana, United States: The Indianapolis Marriott Downtown was the largest hotel in the state of Indiana when it was built in 2001, until it was surpassed by the JW Marriott Indianapolis in 2011.
- Islamabad, Pakistan: The Islamabad Marriott Hotel is in a compound overlooking the Margalla Hills at the foothills of Himalayas.
- Kaohsiung, Taiwan: Kaohsiung Marriott Hotel is the second Marriott in Taiwan and the largest Marriott hotel in Asia with 700 rooms.
- Kochi, India: Kochi Marriot Hotel was opened in 2014 as the group's fifth flagship property in India.
- Liverpool, United Kingdom: The Crowne Plaza Liverpool John Lennon Airport Hotel was formerly managed by Marriott.
- London, United Kingdom:
  - The London Marriott Hotel Park Lane sits on top of the former Somerset House and Camelford House.
  - The London Marriott Canary Wharf occupies the bottom 12 floors of 1 West India Quay mixed-use skyscraper, near the Museum of London Docklands.
  - The London Marriott Hotel County Hall repurposes a Grade II-listed county hall originally used as the headquarters of the local government of London.
- Minneapolis, Minnesota, United States: The Minneapolis Marriott City Center Hotel is the tallest hotel in Minneapolis. Professional wrestler Eddie Guerrero was found dead of heart failure at the hotel on November 13, 2005.
- Miri, Malaysia: The Miri Marriott Resort & Spa is the first international-branded hotel in Miri.
- Montreal, Québec, Canada: The Château Champlain, near the Place du Canada, was built in time for Expo 67 and was the tallest hotel in Canada at the time. It became a Marriott in 1995.
- New Castle, New Hampshire, United States: The historic Wentworth by the Sea resort was managed by Marriott between 2003 and 2023.
- New Orleans, Louisiana, United States: The New Orleans Marriott is the seventh-tallest building in New Orleans. Convicted murderer Robert Durst was arrested by the FBI while staying at the hotel on March 14, 2015.
- New York City, United States:
  - The New York Marriott Marquis, located on Times Square and designed by John C. Portman Jr., is one of the largest hotels in the city. It houses the Marquis Theatre on the third floor.
  - The Marriott World Trade Center, formerly the Vista International Hotel prior to 1995, was part of the original World Trade Center complex in Lower Manhattan. The hotel was damaged during the 1993 World Trade Center bombing and was completely destroyed by the collapse of the World Trade Center during the September 11 attacks. The hotel was not rebuilt afterwards, its site being used for the National September 11 Memorial & Museum, although its address, 3 World Trade Center, was reused for a skyscraper built in 2018.
- Niagara Falls, Ontario, Canada: The Niagara Falls Marriott Fallsview Hotel & Spa and Niagara Falls Marriott on the Falls are a pair of Marriott properties facing the Niagara Falls. The former opened as a Marriott in 1998, while the latter opened as a Sheraton in 1993, before it was rebranded a Marriott in 2011.
- Noord, Aruba: The Aruba Marriott Resort & Stellaris Casino was built in 1995 in the northwestern Aruban town of Noord.
- Norfolk, United States: The Norfolk Waterside Marriott is a landmark building in Downtown Norfolk.
- Norwich, United Kingdom: The Sprowston Manor was managed by Marriott between 1973 and 2018.
- Orlando, Florida, United States: With 2,008 rooms, the Orlando World Center Marriott is the largest Marriott in the world and was the largest hotel in Florida at the time of its 1986 opening. It is near the Walt Disney World complex.
- Ottawa, Ontario, Canada: The Ottawa Marriott Hotel opened as a Holiday Inn in 1971 and also spent several years as a Radisson. Ottawa's only revolving room, Summit, can be found on the hotel's roof.
- Paradise Valley, Arizona, United States: In 1968, the Camelback Inn was bought by Bill Marriott, who once stayed there with his parents as a teenager. It became Marriott's Camelback Inn, the company's first ever resort. In 2003, it was renovated and rebranded as a JW Marriott.
- Peoria, Illinois, United States: The Peoria Marriott Pere Marquette is the city's only surviving upscale hotel built in the 1920s. It was designed by Horace Trumbauer.
- Portland, Oregon, United States:
  - The Portland Marriott Downtown Waterfront opened as the Portland Marriott Hotel in 1980.
  - The Bidwell Marriott Portland was opened as the Portland Marriott City Center in 1996. It acquired its present name following its 2021 renovation.
- Salt Lake City, Utah, United States: The Salt Lake Marriott Downtown at City Creek was one of the few buildings built prior to the development of the City Creek Center.
- San Antonio, Texas, United States: The San Antonio Marriott Rivercenter is the tallest building in San Antonio and the tallest hotel in Texas outside Dallas. It is located near the Henry B. González Convention Center and has direct access to the San Antonio River Walk.
- San Francisco, California, United States: The San Francisco Marriott Marquis is recognizable by its postmodern style and is the second-tallest hotel in San Francisco. It opened the same day as the 1989 Loma Prieta earthquake, to which it lost only a single window as result of better earthquake proofing.
- St. Louis, Missouri, United States: The Marriott St. Louis Grand Hotel was originally a Statler Hotel acquired by Hilton in 1954, but it left the chain in 1966. It reopened as a Renaissance (also owned by Marriott) in 2002, but it closed in 2009 after its owners failed to repay interest payments to bondholders. Following renovations, it reopened for the second time as a Marriott in 2015.
- Syracuse, New York, United States: The Marriott Syracuse Downtown is a historic hotel originally opened in 1924 as Hotel Syracuse and spent some time as a Hilton in the 1980s, before it joined Marriott in 2015 after a $57 million restoration. It has been added to the National Register of Historic Places.
- Taipei, Taiwan: The Taipei Marriott Hotel is located in the Yihwa International Complex.
- Tbilisi, Georgia: The Tbilisi Marriott Hotel was designed to be the most luxurious hotel in Tbilisi in 1915, initially with the name Hôtel Majestic, by Armenian merchant Mikael Aramyants. After several years being converted into a hospital and an office, it became a hotel again in 1939 under the name Hotel Tbilisi. Marriott assumed management of the property in 2002 after an extensive reconstruction.
- Thundridge, United Kingdom: The Hanbury Manor is a Grade II listed Victorian era manor house and golf course that was converted to a hotel in 1990.
- Washington, D.C., United States:
  - The Washington Marriott Wardman Park was taken over by Marriott in 1998, before which it was managed by Sheraton. The building's Wardman Tower dates back to 1928 and has been added to the National Register of Historic Places. The hotel closed in 2020 due to the COVID-19 pandemic.
  - The Marriott Marquis Washington, DC is connected to the Walter E. Washington Convention Center by an underground concourse, and its clientele mostly consists of convention attendees.
- Yerevan, Armenia: The Armenia Marriott Hotel Yerevan, located near the Republic Square, opened as the government-owned Armenia Hotel in 1959. Following the fall of communism, it was privatized, with Marriott assuming management in 1999. It is the second-largest hotel in the country.
- Nagoya, Japan: The Nagoya Marriott Associa hotel located near Nagoya station is a 52-story hotel directly above Nagoya station. The hotel is connected to Nagoya station by a passageway.

== See also ==
- Marriott Syracuse Downtown
- Marriott World Trade Center
- Marriott Marquis
