= Hong Kong International Airport Automated People Mover =

Public transport system in Hong Kong

Hong Kong International Airport APM
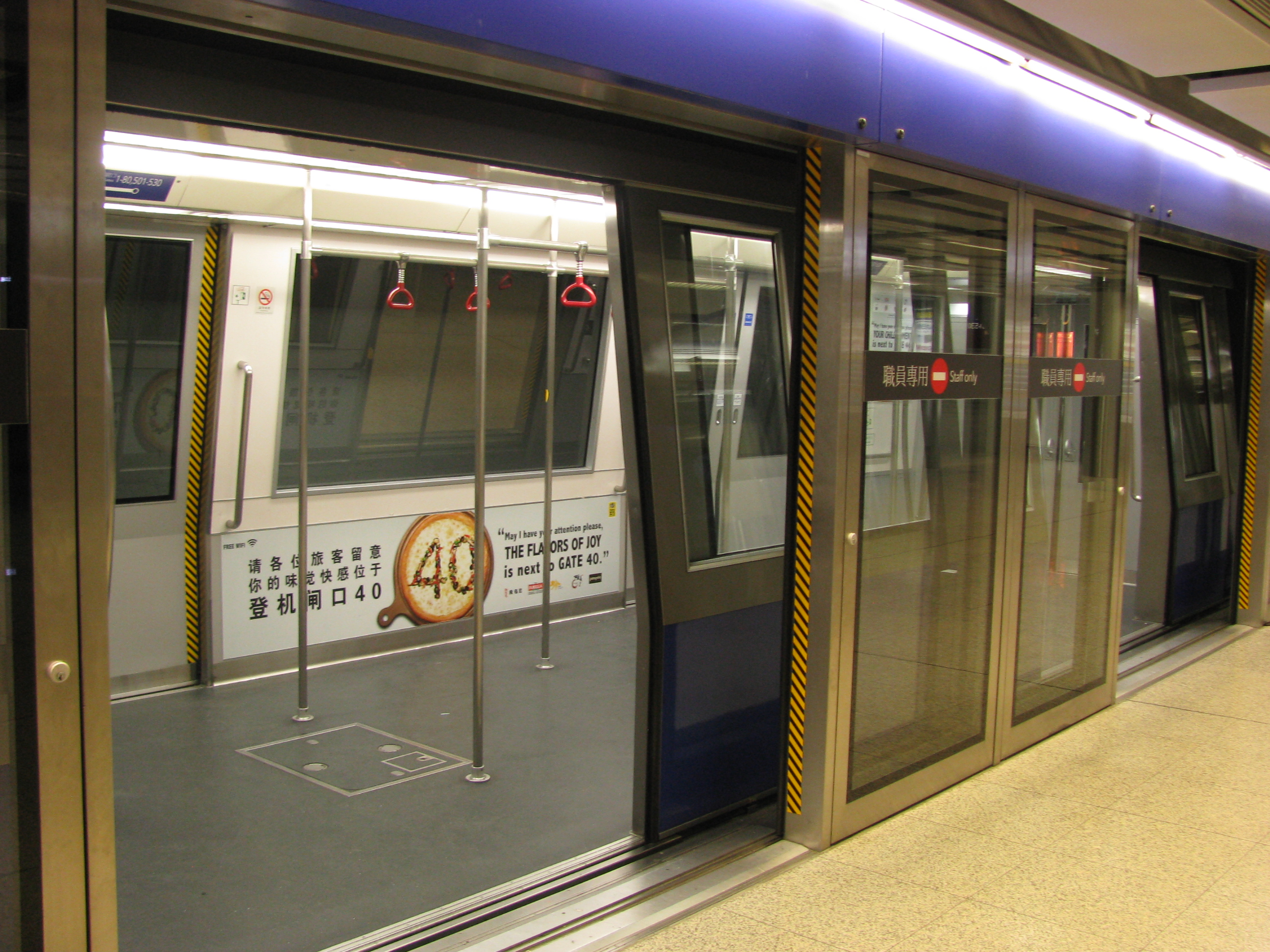

Overview
- Locale: Hong Kong International Airport, Chek Lap Kok, Hong Kong
- Transit type: Automated guideway transit
- Number of lines: 3
- Number of stations: 5
- Website: hongkongairport.com

Operation
- Began operation: 6 July 1998; 28 years ago
- Operators: Airport Authority Hong Kong; MTR Corporation
- Number of vehicles: 56

Technical
- Track gauge: 1,700 mm (5 ft 6 15/16 in)

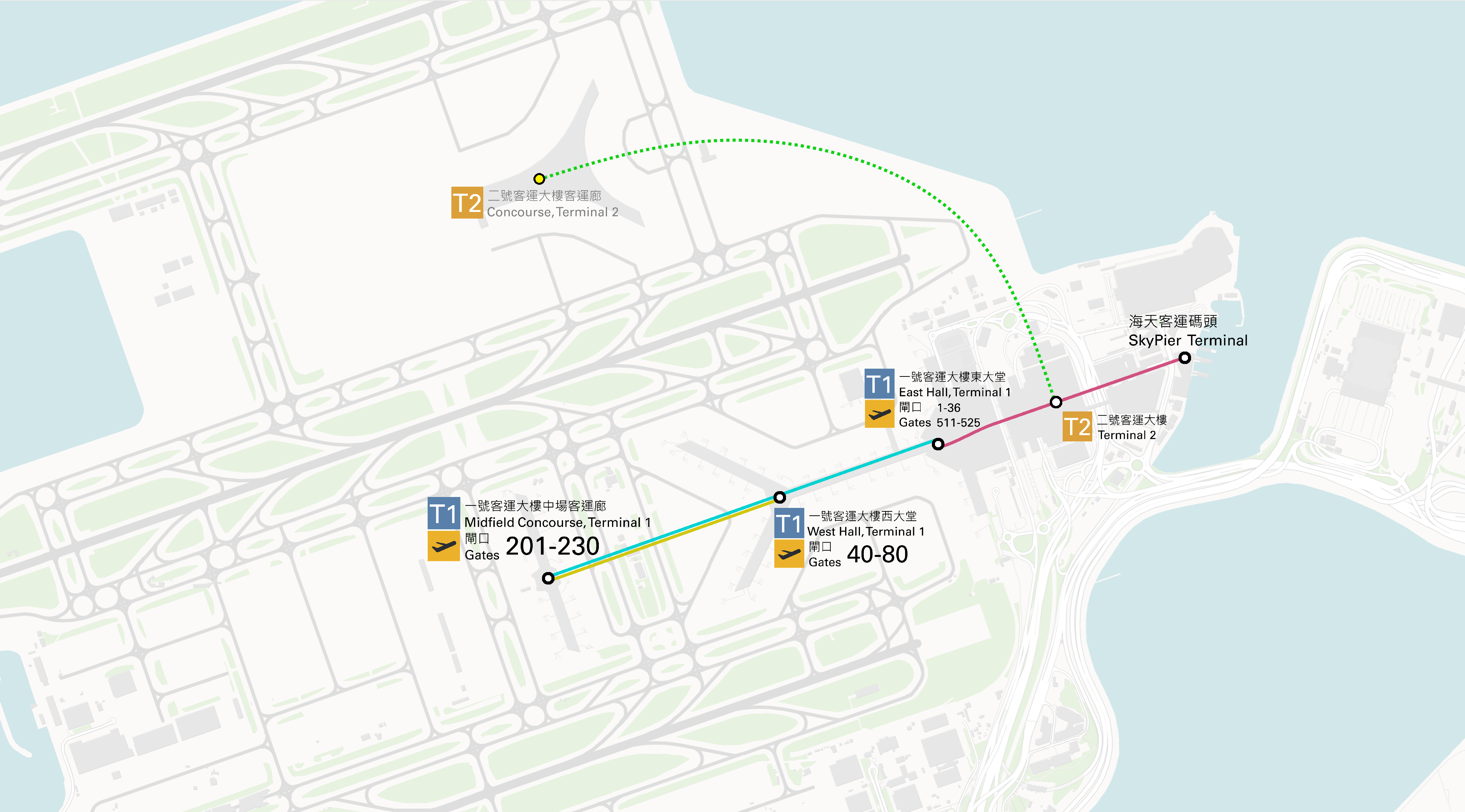
Hong Kong International Airport Automated People Mover Map

The Hong Kong International Airport APM is a driverless people mover located within Hong Kong International Airport. It operates in two segments within Terminal 1 and the Midfield Concourse, and between Terminals 1 and 2. It also connects to the Skypier.

== Setup ==
The first segment runs between the East Hall and the West Hall in Terminal 1. The segment aims to provide a faster and easier way for passengers travelling between immigration and boarding gates at the far end of the Terminal. Westbound service is for departure passengers only, while eastbound service is for arrival passengers only. Passengers cannot take the APM back to the East Hall, where most shops are located. For eastbound service, after reaching the East Hall, all arrival passengers must disembark for immigration, customs, and baggage claim. They are not allowed to take the APM back to the West Hall. Since both East and West Halls are located within Terminal 1, passengers can choose to use travellators instead or walk, though this will be more time-consuming.

The second segment of the system runs from the SkyPier to Terminal 2 and then continues to the East Hall of Terminal 1. Different from the first segment, the second segment is the only means by which these three places are connected. SkyPier passengers heading for departing flights must take the westbound service of this segment to the East Hall of Terminal 1. SkyPier passengers are not allowed to alight at Terminal 2. Departure passengers from Terminal 2 can join the westbound service of the second segment from Terminal 2. All passengers must leave the train when it arrives at the East Hall of Terminal 1. Depending on the boarding gate location of their onward flight, passengers can change to the first segment of APM system at the opposite platform of the East Hall, to continue their way to the West Hall, or simply approach the boarding gate directly from the East Hall. The eastbound service is only for arrival passengers heading to SkyPier for ferry service to PRD ports. Ferry tickets will be checked before passengers may board the APM. Once arriving at the SkyPier, passengers cannot travel back to Terminal 1. Since there is no eastbound platform in Terminal 2, there is no intermediate station for the eastbound service.

The section from the East Hall to SkyPier is for SkyPier passengers and staff only. The first segment began operations in 1998, while the second segment began operations in early 2007. The SkyPier extension was opened to the public in late 2009.

In Late 2015, the Midfield Concourse extension was opened when the Midfield Concourse started operation.

== Facts ==
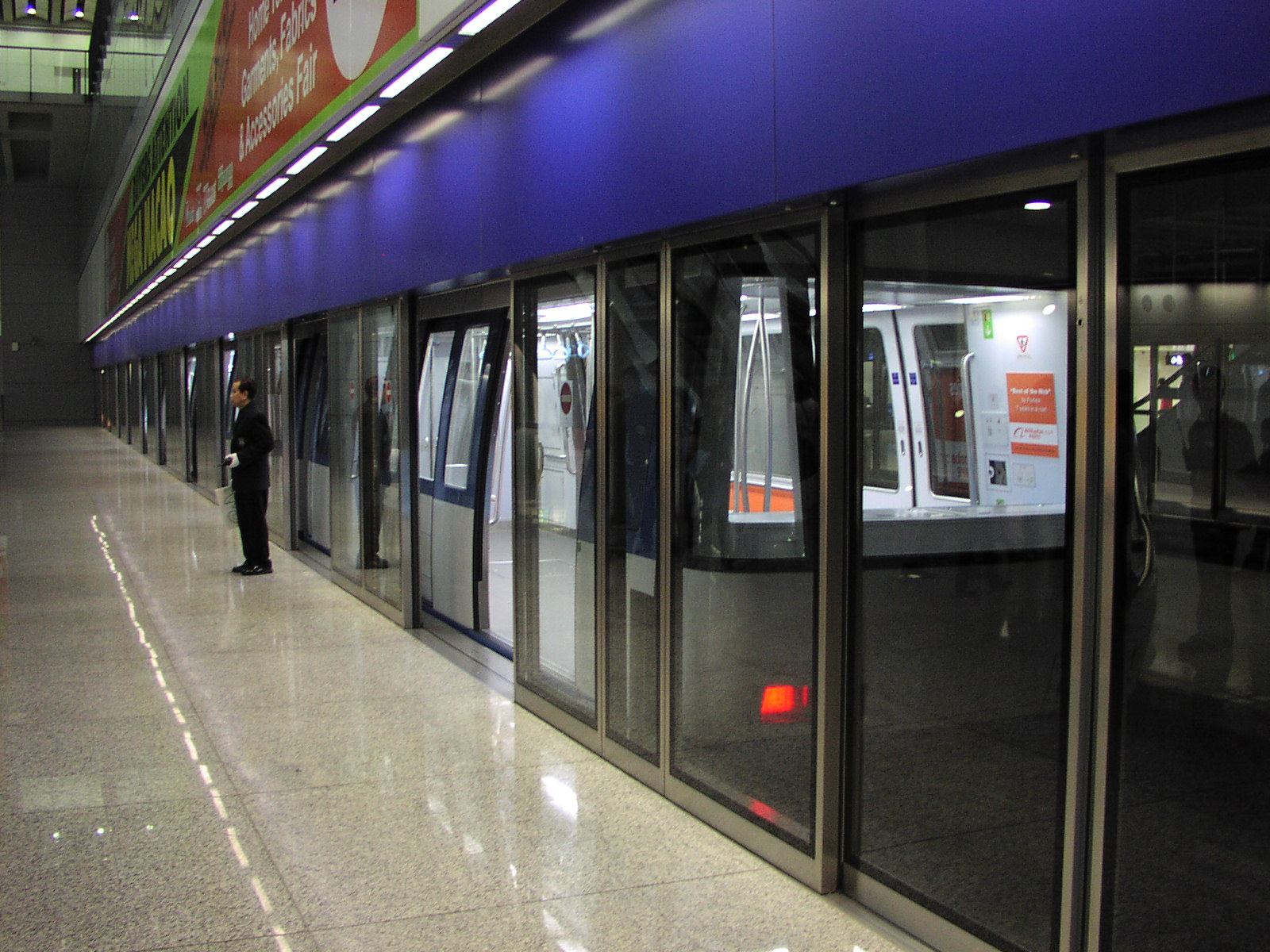
On the platform

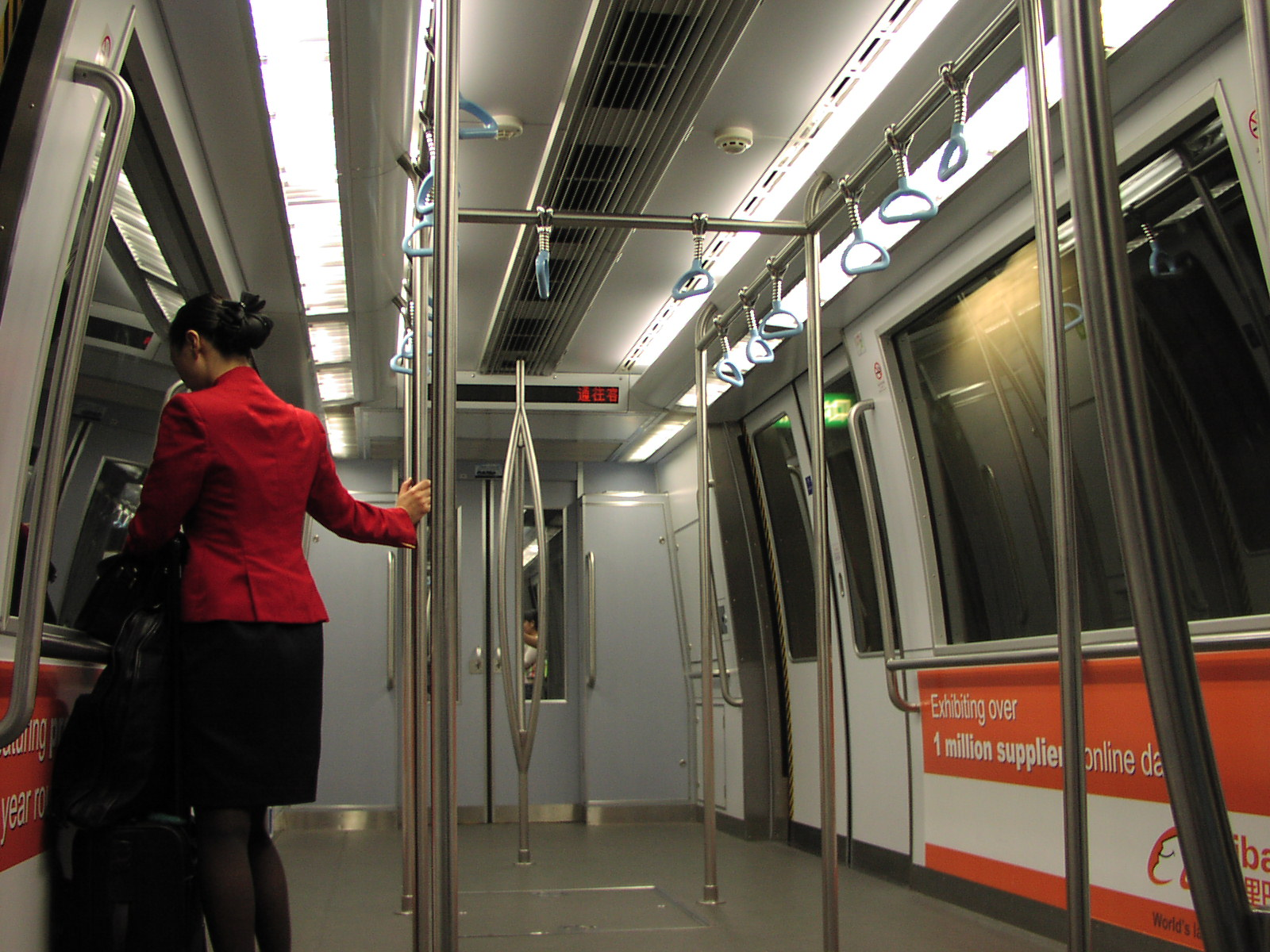
Inside a train

- Section length:
  - From Terminal 1 East Hall to Terminal 1 West Hall: 750m
  - From Terminal 2 to Terminal 1 East Hall: 430m
  - From Skypier to Terminal 2: 750m
  - From Midfield Concourse to Terminal 1 West Hall: 1000m (Estimated figures only)
- Stations: 5 (gates 201-230, gates 40-80, gates 1-36 of Terminal 1, Terminal 2, and SkyPier)
- Rolling stock:
  - Mitsubishi Heavy Industries Crystal Mover, 8 cars (phase 1 stock, decommissioned)
  - Ishikawajima-Harima Heavy Industries, 12 cars (phase 2 stock)
  - Mitsubishi Heavy Industries Crystal Mover, 8 cars (phase 3 stock)
  - IHI Corporation|Ishikawajima-Harima Heavy Industries, 16 cars (phase 4 stock)
  - Niigata Transys, 20 cars (phase 5 stock)
  - CRRC Nanjing Puzhen, 36 cars (phase 6 stock, Future T2 Line only)
  - CRRC Nanjing Puzhen, 20 cars (phase 7 stock, replacement of retire phase 2 & 3 train stock)
- Speed: 60 km/h
- Capacity: 60 passengers per car

== Expansion ==
=== Terminal 2 Concourse ===
The system will be reconfigured into three distinct lines: T1 line, T2 line and SkyPier line. T1 line will be extended one station eastwards to terminate at T2 APM interchange station. The SkyPier line will be shortened to serve between T2 station and SkyPier station, with a possibility of extending eastward to the HZMB Hong Kong port. T2 line will be a brand new line with three stations serving T2 passenger terminal and the T2 concourse. The APM capacity will also be increased to six cars per train.

In 2022, CRRC Puzhen Alstom Transportation System (PATS) won the contract to operate the line running between T2 and T2 concourse running on Innovia APM 300 stock.

== Maintenance ==
The APM system is maintained by MTR Corporation.
