= Portland Marriott Downtown Waterfront =

Hotel in Portland, Oregon, U.S.

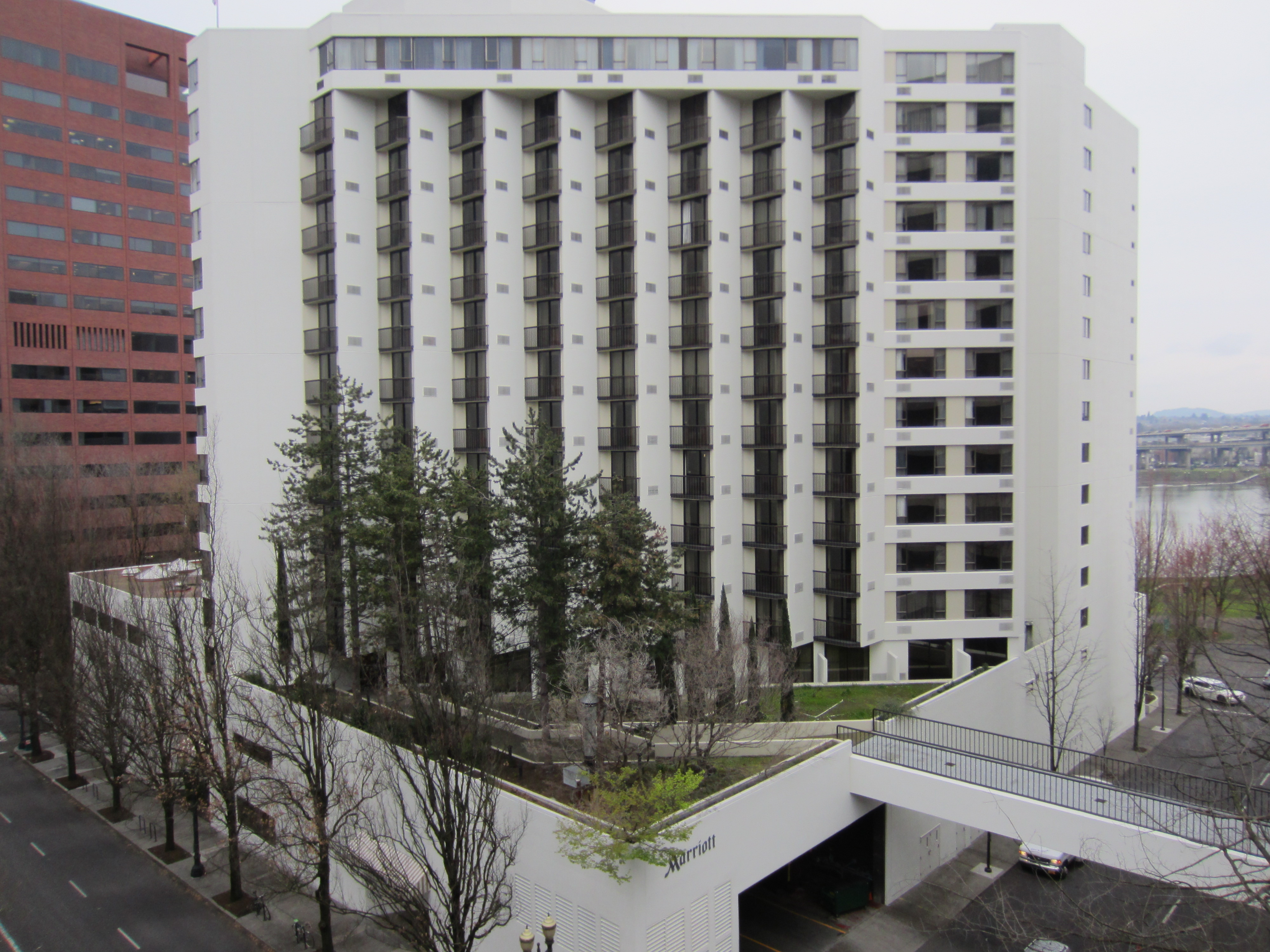
- Interactive map of the Portland Marriott Downtown Waterfront area

General information
- Type: Hotel
- Location: Portland, Oregon, United States
- Coordinates: 45.5123849°N 122.6759331°W
- Completed: 1980
- Renovated: 2015
- Owner: Marriott

Website
- Portland Marriott Downtown Waterfront at Marriott

The Portland Marriott Downtown Waterfront is a Marriott hotel in downtown Portland, Oregon, United States. It opened in 1980 as the Portland Marriott Hotel. The hotel underwent a major renovation in 2015.

The restaurant Truss replaced the Champions Restaurant & Sports Bar in 2012.

== See also ==
- List of Marriott hotels
