= Niagara Falls Marriott on the Falls =

Niagara Falls, Ontario, Canada

Coordinates: 43.078096°N 79.082294°W

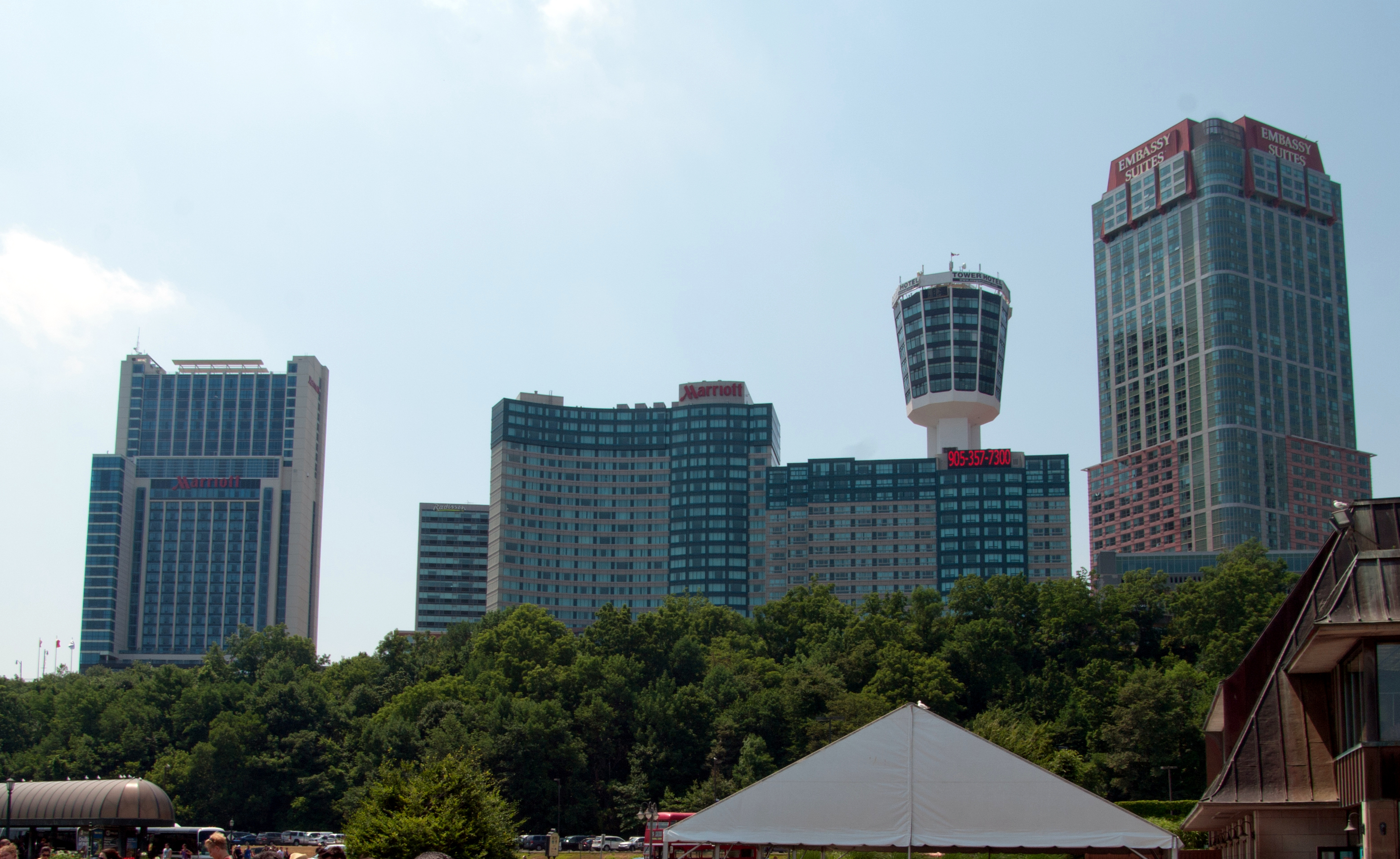
- Niagara Falls Marriott on the Falls (left), Niagara Falls Marriott Fallsview Hotel & Spa (center), 2012
- Interactive map of the Niagara Falls Marriott on the Falls area
- Former names: Sheraton Fallsview Hotel, Marriott Gateway on the Falls

General information
- Location: 6755 Fallsview Boulevard; Niagara Falls, Ontario; L2G 3W7
- Opening: 1993
- Management: Marriott

Technical details
- Floor count: 32

Other information
- Number of rooms: 405
- Number of suites: 36
- Number of restaurants: 3
- Parking: on-site valet off-site

Website
- Official site

Niagara Falls Marriott on the Falls is a 335 feet (102 m) tall hotel in Niagara Falls, Ontario, Canada.

The hotel opened in 1993 as 20-story the Sheraton Fallsview Hotel. The hotel was expanded in 2000, adding floors 22–31. The hotel left Sheraton for Marriott in 2011 and became the Marriott Gateway on the Falls. It was renamed Niagara Falls Marriott on the Falls in 2017. There are two rooms on the 32nd floor which are only used when the hotel has no rooms (or by request). Being one of the tallest structures in the city, it can be seen throughout the general tourist area.

The hotel was host to the first webcam overlooking Niagara Falls. Installed in 1998 at the former top floor prior to the expansion in 2000. In 2012 the webcam was replaced as part of the $15 million renovation of the structure initiated in 2011.

This is one of the original Fallsview hotels.

== See also ==
- Marriott International
- Marriott Hotels
- Marriott Niagara Falls Hotel Fallsview & Spa
- Niagara Fallsview Casino Resort
