= Lam Chau =

Former island of Hong Kong

Native name: 欖洲

Geography
- Location: West of Chek Lap Kok; North of Lantau Island
- Area: 0.08 km^{2} (0.031 sq mi)
- Length: 0.45 km (0.28 mi)
- Highest elevation: 100 m (300 ft)

Administration
- Hong Kong

Demographics
- Population: Uninhabited

Lam Chau
- Traditional Chinese: 欖洲
- Simplified Chinese: 榄洲
Transcriptions
Standard Mandarin
- Hanyu Pinyin: Lǎn Zhōu
Yue: Cantonese
- Yale Romanization: Láahm jāu
- Jyutping: Laam5 zau1
- IPA: [lam˩˧.tsɐw˥]

Lam Chau (simplified Chinese: 榄洲; traditional Chinese: 欖洲) was a former island in Hong Kong. It was one of the two original islands that made up the site of the current Hong Kong International Airport, alongside Chek Lap Kok.

This small island lay to the west of Chek Lap Kok and north of Lantau Island. It had an area of 0.08 km^{2} (0.031 sq mi) and was 450 m (1,480 ft) long. It had a narrow rocky shoreline and small hills (less than 100 m or 330 ft tall) covered by vegetation and shrubs. Like Chek Lap Kok, geologically, Lam Chau consisted of granite.

During 1992-1996, the island was flattened and joined into Chek Lap Kok by land reclamation as part of the airport's construction. The former island is now part of the southwest side of the post-reclamation Chek Lap Kok, located close to the western end of the south runway.
