= Niagara Falls Marriott Fallsview Hotel & Spa =

Hotel in Niagara Falls, Ontario (Canada)

Coordinates: 43.078611°N 79.081944°W

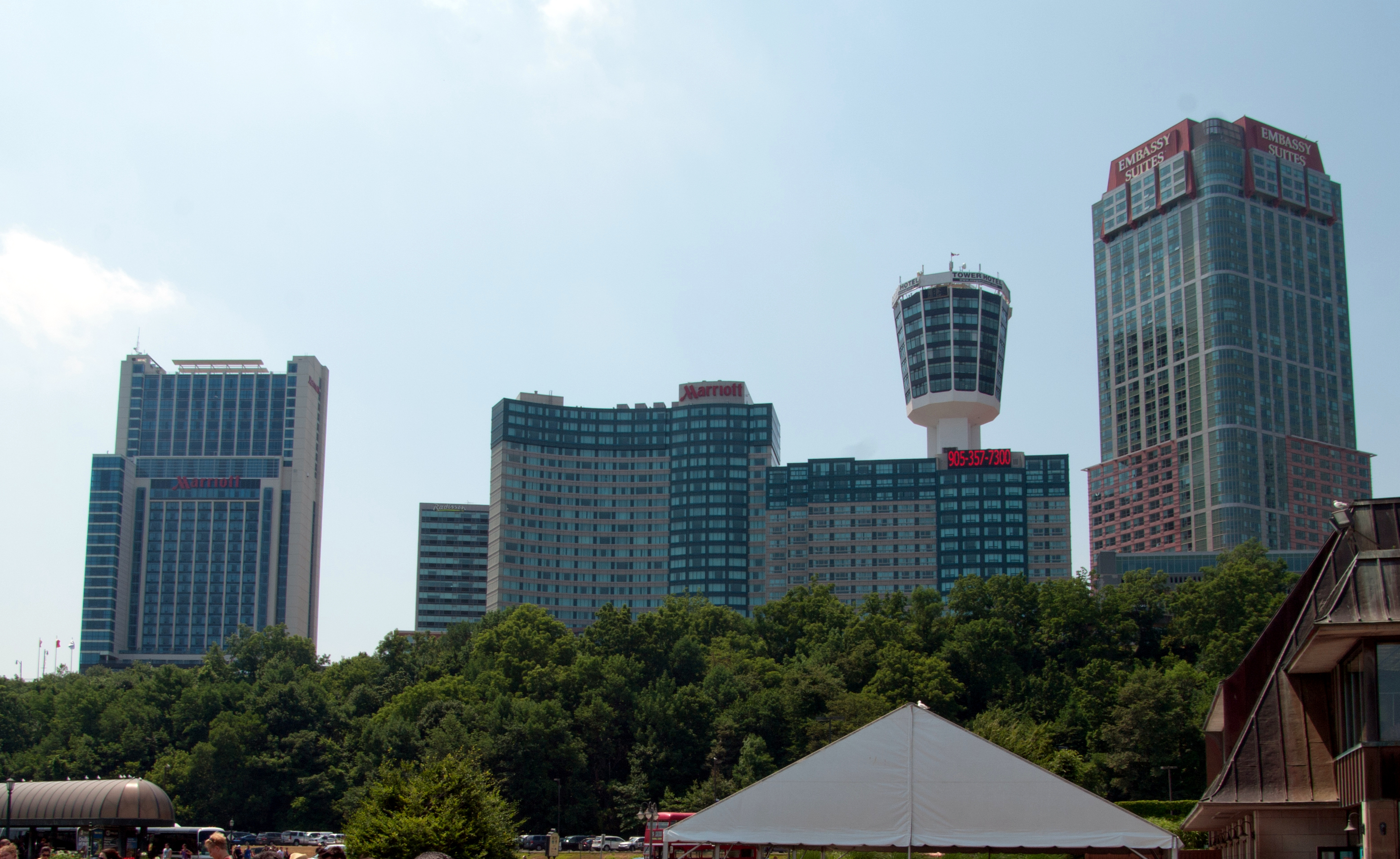
- Niagara Falls Marriott on the Falls (left), Niagara Falls Marriott Fallsview Hotel & Spa (center), 2012
- Interactive map of the Niagara Falls Marriott Fallsview Hotel & Spa area

General information
- Location: 6740 Fallsview Boulevard; Niagara Falls, Ontario; L2G 3W6
- Opening: 1998
- Management: Marriott

Technical details
- Floor count: 23

Other information
- Number of rooms: 432
- Number of suites: 36
- Number of restaurants: 3
- Parking: valet off-site

Website
- Official site

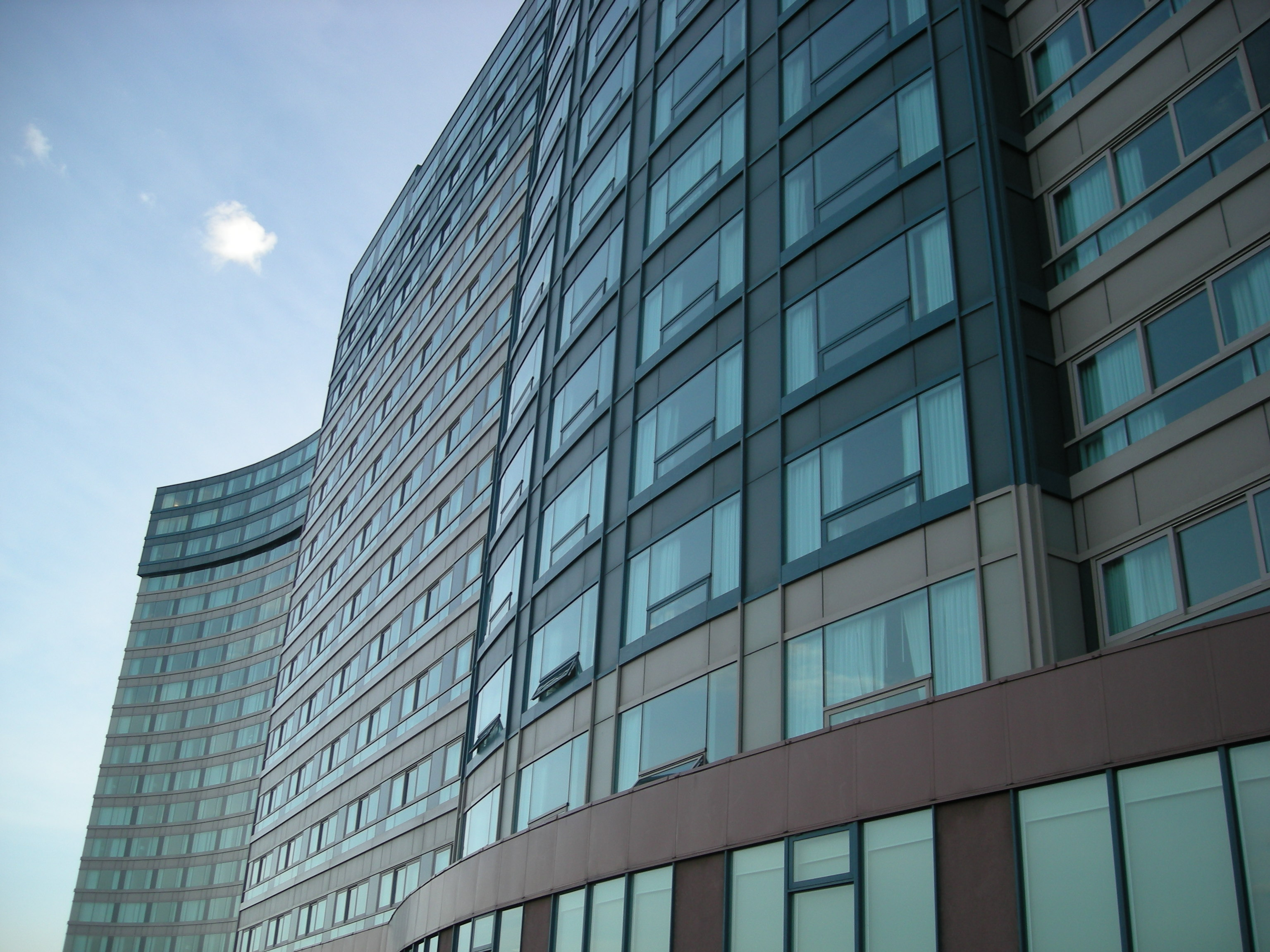
Niagara Falls Marriott Fallsview Hotel & Spa, 2010

The Niagara Falls Marriott Fallsview Hotel & Spa is a 197 feet (60 m) tall hotel in Niagara Falls, Ontario. The hotel opened in 1998 with over 20 room floors, as well as three additional levels for Spa, Lobby, and Restaurant/Mezzanine. The addition of a second tower section in the year 2002 increased the number of rooms by 185 across 14 guest floors in a 17-story structure.

Being one of the tallest structures in the region, it can be seen throughout the general tourist area.

== See also ==
- Marriott International
- Marriott Hotels
- Niagara Fallsview Casino Resort
- Marriott on the Falls Hotel
