= Scenic Hill (Hong Kong) =

Hill in Hong Kong

- 觀景山
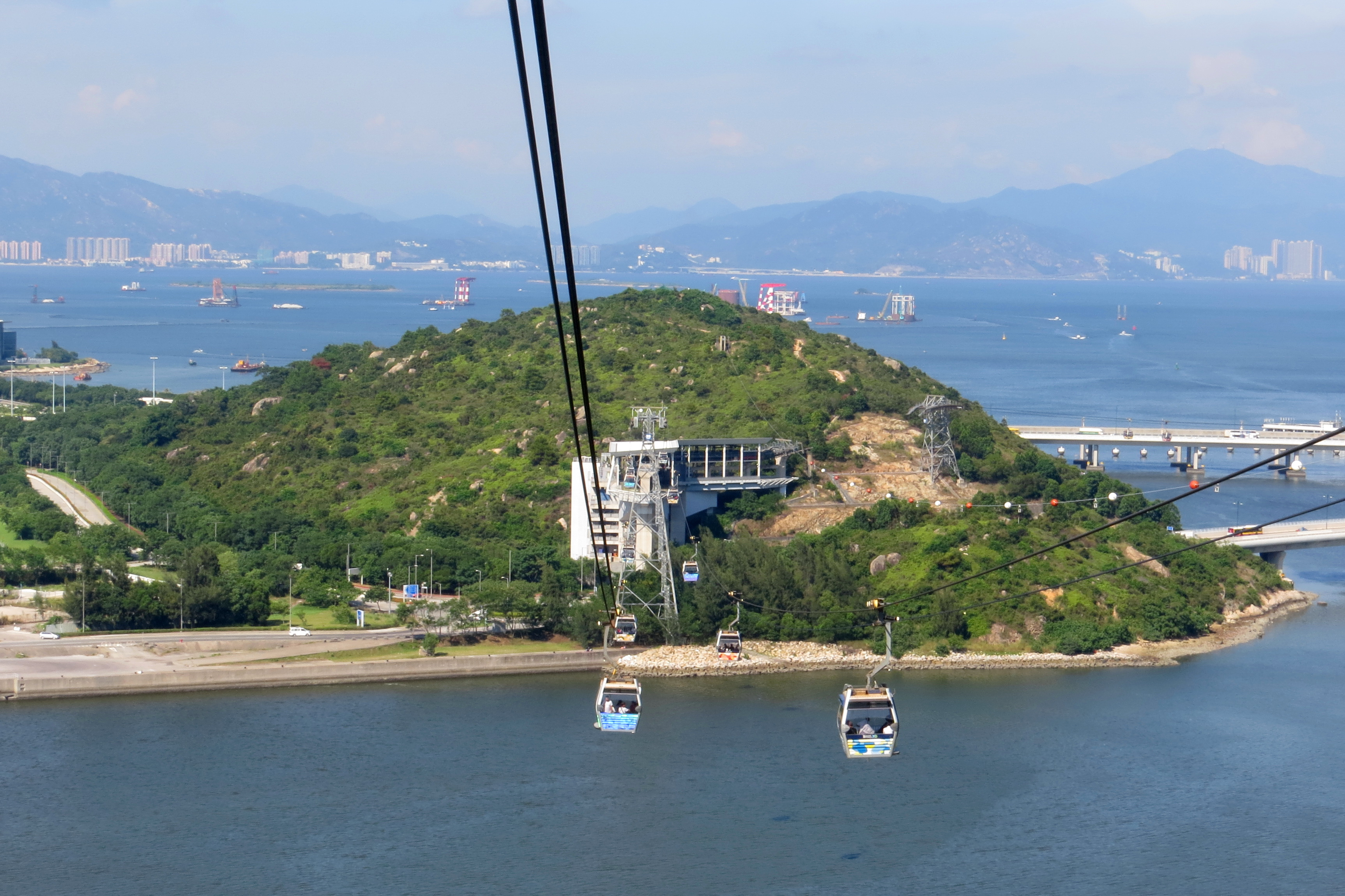
- View of Scenic Hill

Highest point
- Elevation: 77 m (253 ft)
- Coordinates: 22°17′39.58″N 113°56′8.75″E

Geography
- Location within Hong Kong
- Location: Hong Kong

Scenic Hill (Chinese: 觀景山) is a hill on Chek Lap Kok, Hong Kong, and stands at a height of 77 metres (253 ft) above the sea level. Today, Scenic Hill is the tallest point on Chek Lap Kok Island, which houses Hong Kong International Airport. In the 1990s, taller nearby mountains on Chek Lap Kok Island were bulldozed to make reclaimed-land for the airport.

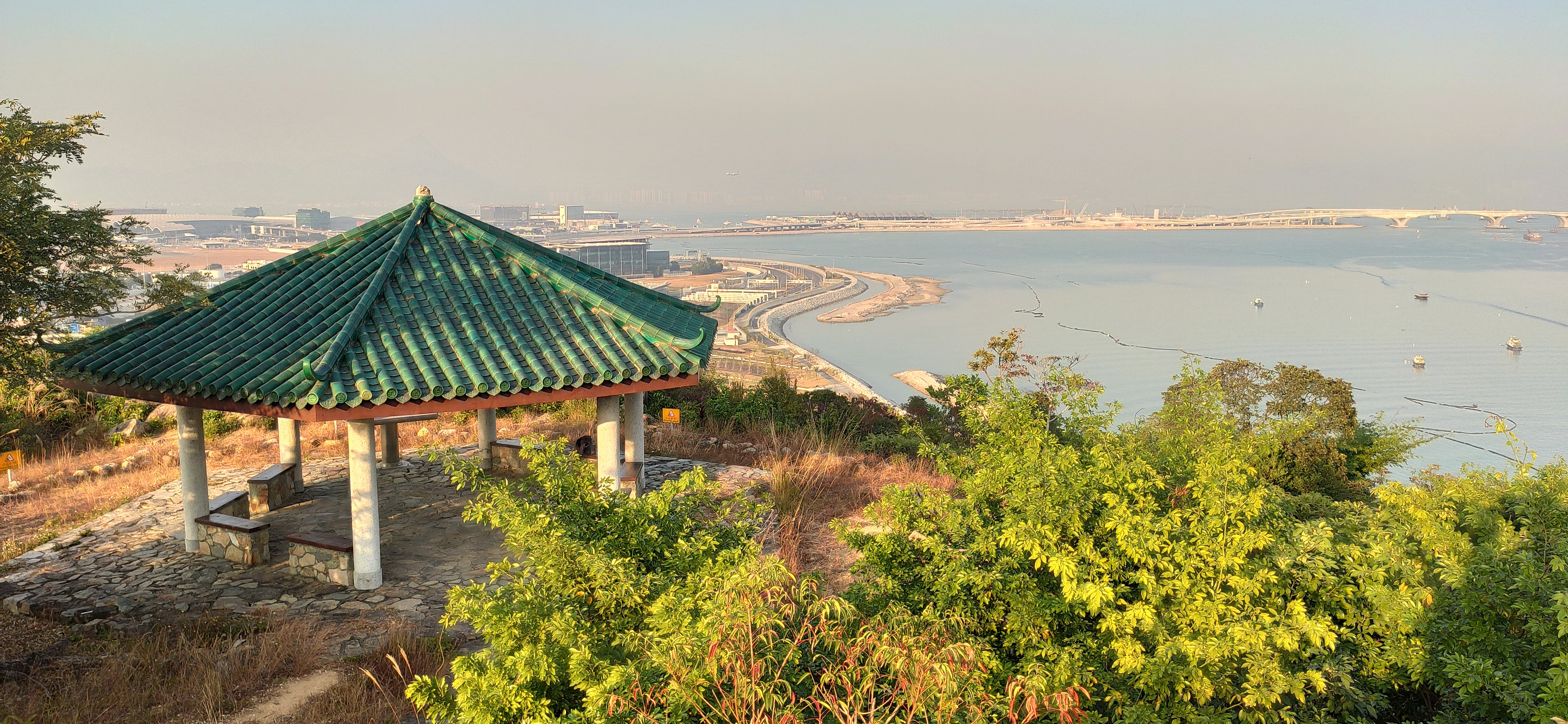
Scenic Hill Pavilion

Near its summit, there is a Chinese pavilion where aviation enthusiasts often gather to take photos of aircraft landings and take-offs.

A tunnel called Scenic Hill Tunnel (觀景山隧道) is a road tunnel located below Scenic Hill. The west exit of the tunnel is near the Ngong Ping 360 Airport Island Angle Station and the fuel storage centre.

== Access ==
There is a trail path that leads hikers to its modest summit. The entrance can be found just below The Ngong Ping 360 Airport Island Angle Station on Chek Lap Kok South Road.

== See also ==
- List of mountains, peaks and hills in Hong Kong
- Lantau Peak
