= The Bidwell Marriott Portland =

Hotel in Portland, Oregon, U.S.

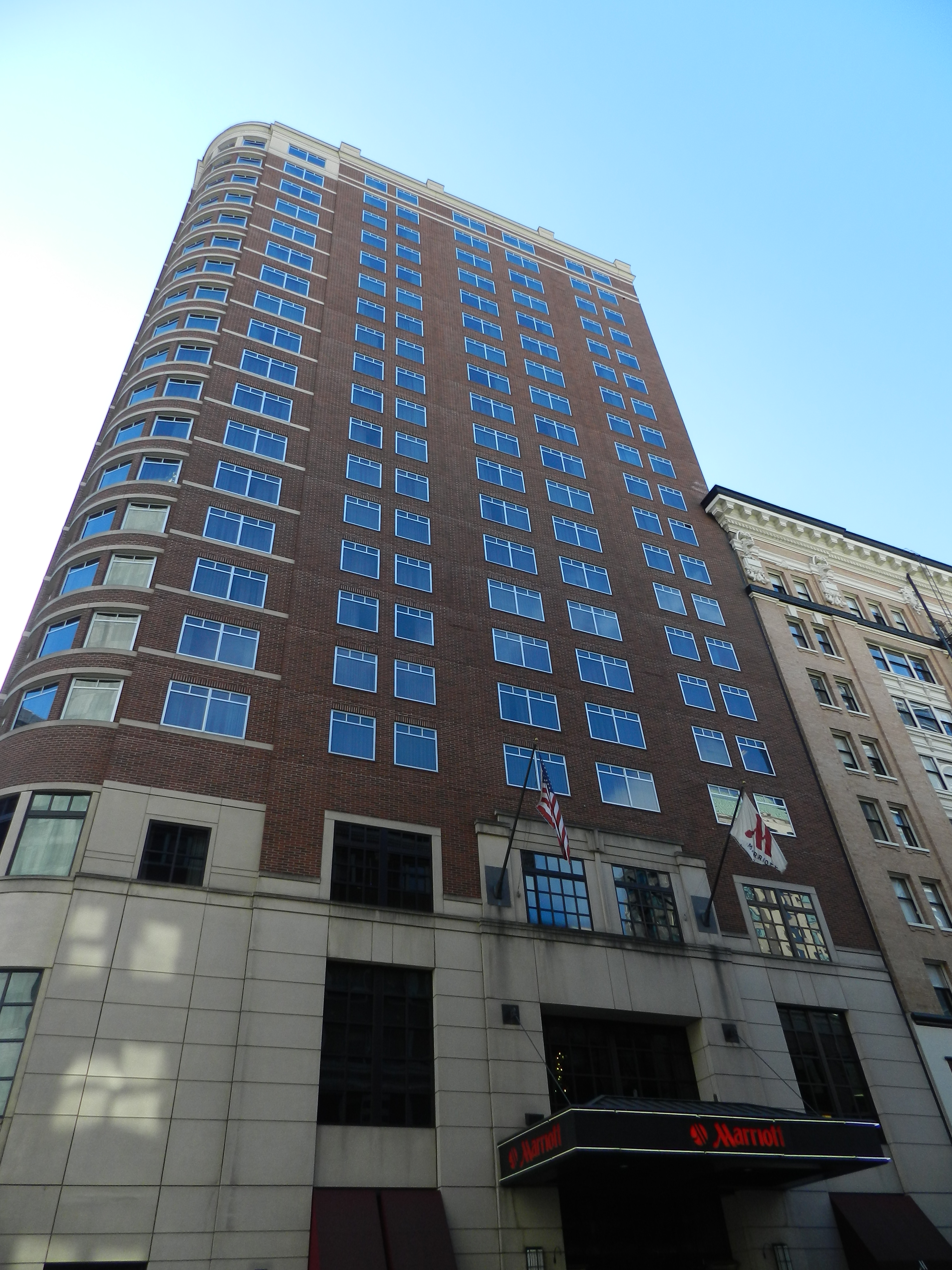
- Interactive map of the The Bidwell Marriott Portland area

General information
- Location: Portland, Oregon, United States
- Coordinates: 45.520426°N 122.678862°W

The Bidwell Marriott Portland is a hotel located at 520 Southwest Broadway in Portland, Oregon, United States.

Construction on the Portland Marriott City Center began in 1996 and the hotel opened in 1999. It closed for renovations in 2020 and reopened in 2021 as The Bidwell Marriott Portland.

== See also ==
- List of Marriott hotels
