= Hong Kong SkyCity =

Business and entertainment complex in Hong Kong

Coordinates: 22°19′10.59″N 113°56′33.36″E

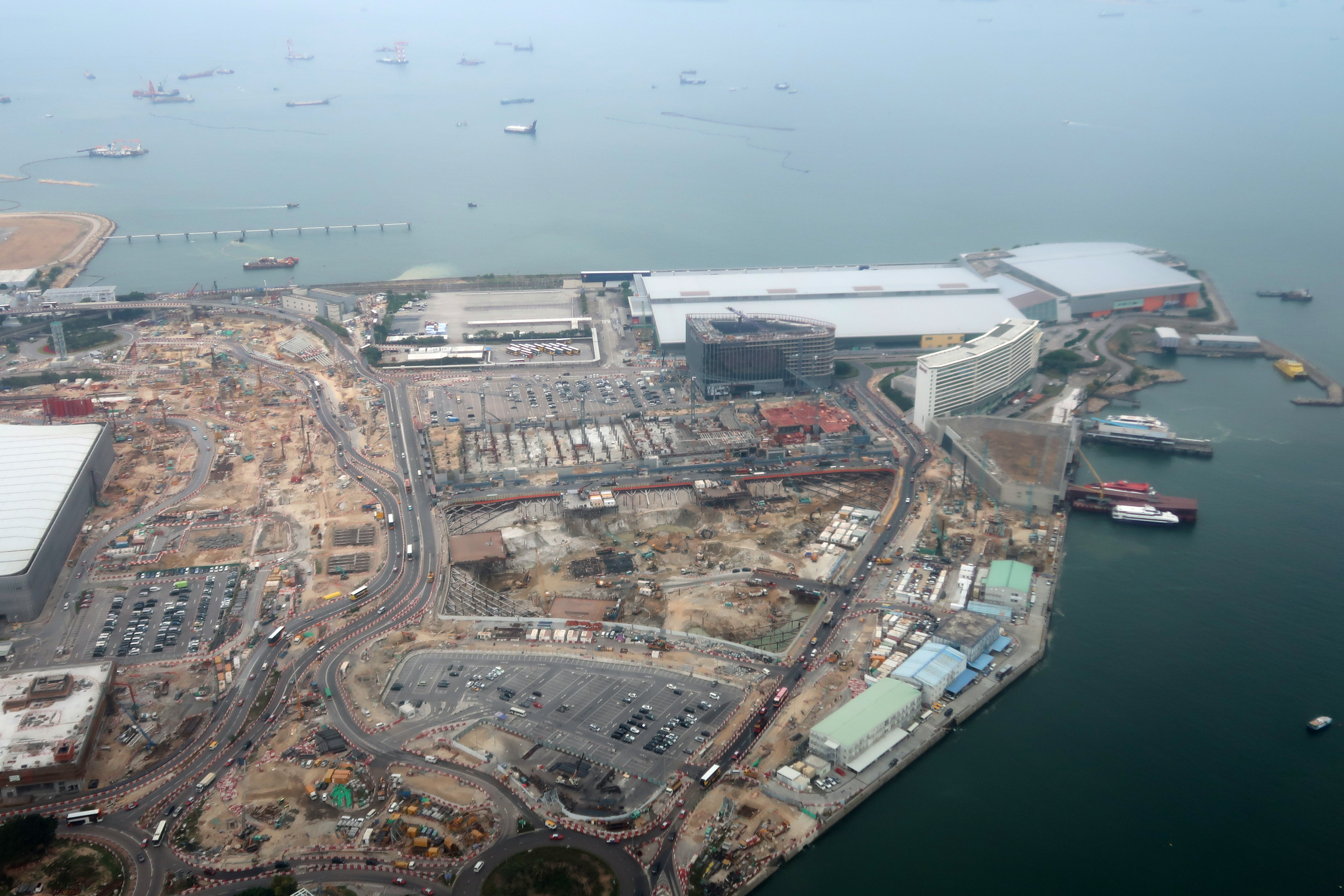
- Aerial view of part of SkyCity in 2019
- Chinese: 香港航天城
Transcriptions
Standard Mandarin
- Hanyu Pinyin: Xiānggǎng Hángtiān Chéng
Yue: Cantonese
- Yale Romanization: Hēung góng hòhng tīn sìhng
- Jyutping: Hoeng1 gong2 hong4 tin1 sing4

Hong Kong SkyCity is a large business and entertainment complex adjacent to Hong Kong International Airport and is built on land owned by the Airport Authority Hong Kong. It currently includes the AsiaWorld–Expo, Terminal 2 (SkyPlaza) and SkyPier.

== Facilities ==
=== AsiaWorld–Expo ===
AsiaWorld–Expo is the largest column-free and perhaps the largest exhibition centre in Hong Kong, boasting over 70,000 cubic meters of space. It hosted numerous trade shows, meetings, and concerts (at the adjacent AsiaWorld–Arena). It is directly connected to the Airport Express.

=== SkyPier ===
SkyPier allows passengers from Mainland China and Macau to access Hong Kong International Airport by jetfoil or ferry. It is connected via automated people mover that transport passengers to the airport for connecting flights and vice versa. SkyPier was designed by the architecture firm Aedas.

=== Hong Kong SkyCity Marriott Hotel ===
Hong Kong SkyCity Marriott Hotel connects to AsiaWorld Expo, the SkyPier and Nine eagle golf course. 13,885 sq ft (1,290.0 m^{2}) of total meeting space can accommodate up to 650 guests. The 658-room hotel was opened in December 2008. The hotel was the first hotel in Hong Kong to receive the Halal food certification.

=== Regala Skycity Hotel ===
Regala Skycity Hotel connects to AsiaWorld-Expo and 11SKIES. The hotel offers 1,208 guestrooms, 3 restaurants and bars plus over 30,138 sq ft (2,800 m²) of indoor meeting spaces including Regala Grand Ballroom and two Banquet Halls.

=== SkyPlaza ===
SkyPlaza is a large entertainment and retail centre is housed in Terminal 2 of the Hong Kong International Airport. The check-in facilities of Terminal 2 opened on 28 February 2007 alongside the opening of Platform 3 of the Airport Express Airport station.

=== Airport World Trade Centre ===
Airport World Trade Centre is a modern Grade A office building located at 1 Sky Plaza Road. It offers commercial office spaces and shared office environments for businesses, particularly those in the airline, logistics, and professional services sectors, due to its proximity to the airport and advanced facilities.

=== 11 SKIES ===
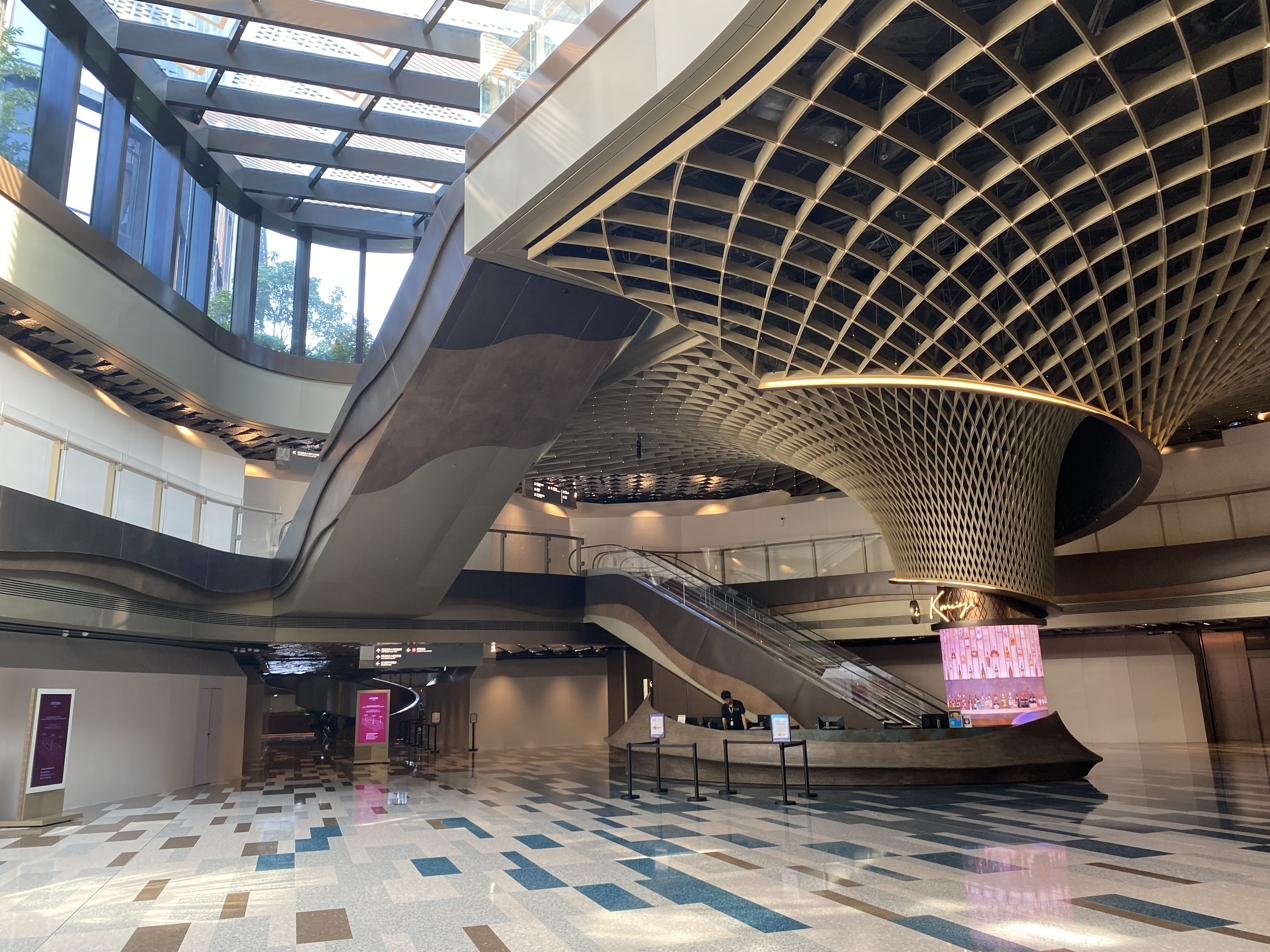
Atrium in 11SKIES, with most of the shops still vacant

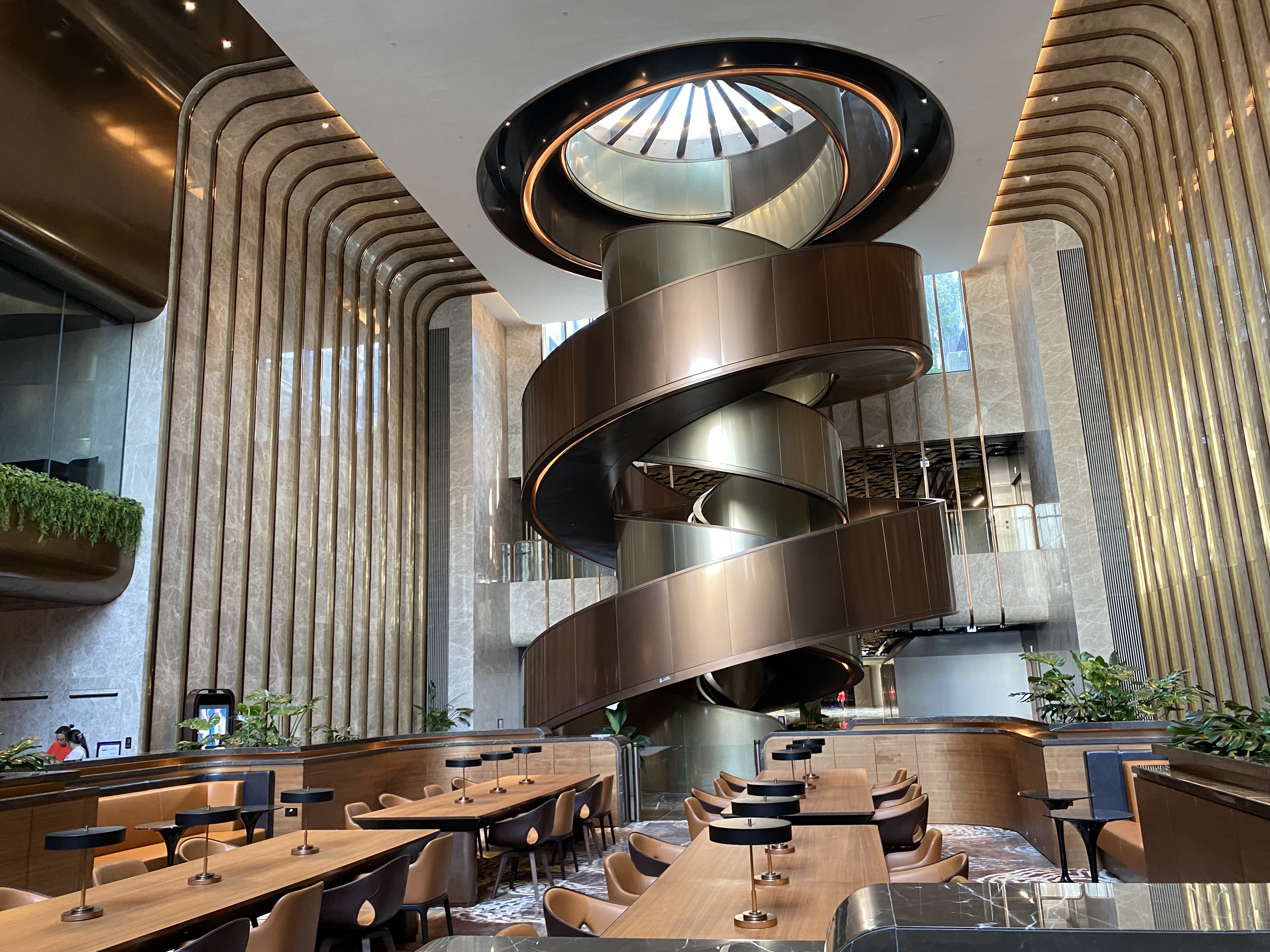
11 SKIES office lobby

Airport Authority Hong Kong announced on 2 May 2018 that New World Development had been awarded the tender for the SkyCity integrated development, which comprises retail complexes, dining areas, hotels, entertainment facilities, and offices. Under the agreement, New World Development will design, construct, finance, and manage the development on sites A2 and A3, adjacent to HKIA's passenger terminals.

On 23 November 2020, New World Development had announced the official name of the project––11 Skies, operated by K11 under the New World Development's portfolio. Scheduled to open in phases from 2022 to 2025, the 3.8 million-square-foot complex will contain 2.66 million sq. ft. dining and retail space, 570,000 sq. ft. experiential entertainment facilities, and 570,000 sq. ft. grade A office space. There will be over 800 shops, including more than 120 restaurants.

In July 2025, Bloomberg reported that New World Development was exploring the sale of its retail and dining portion of 11 SKIES to ease liquidity pressure. However, the Airport Authority stated that it remains in close communication with New World Development and expects the phased opening to proceed in mid-2026. Retail and entertainment components are expected to gradually resume operations in phases.

In October 2026, after posting a record HK$28.1bn loss related to impairments from 11 Skies, New Word Development sold its stake, triggering an early termination clause including payment of HK$2.3bn to the Hong Kong Airport Authority.

== Former elements ==
=== Golf course ===
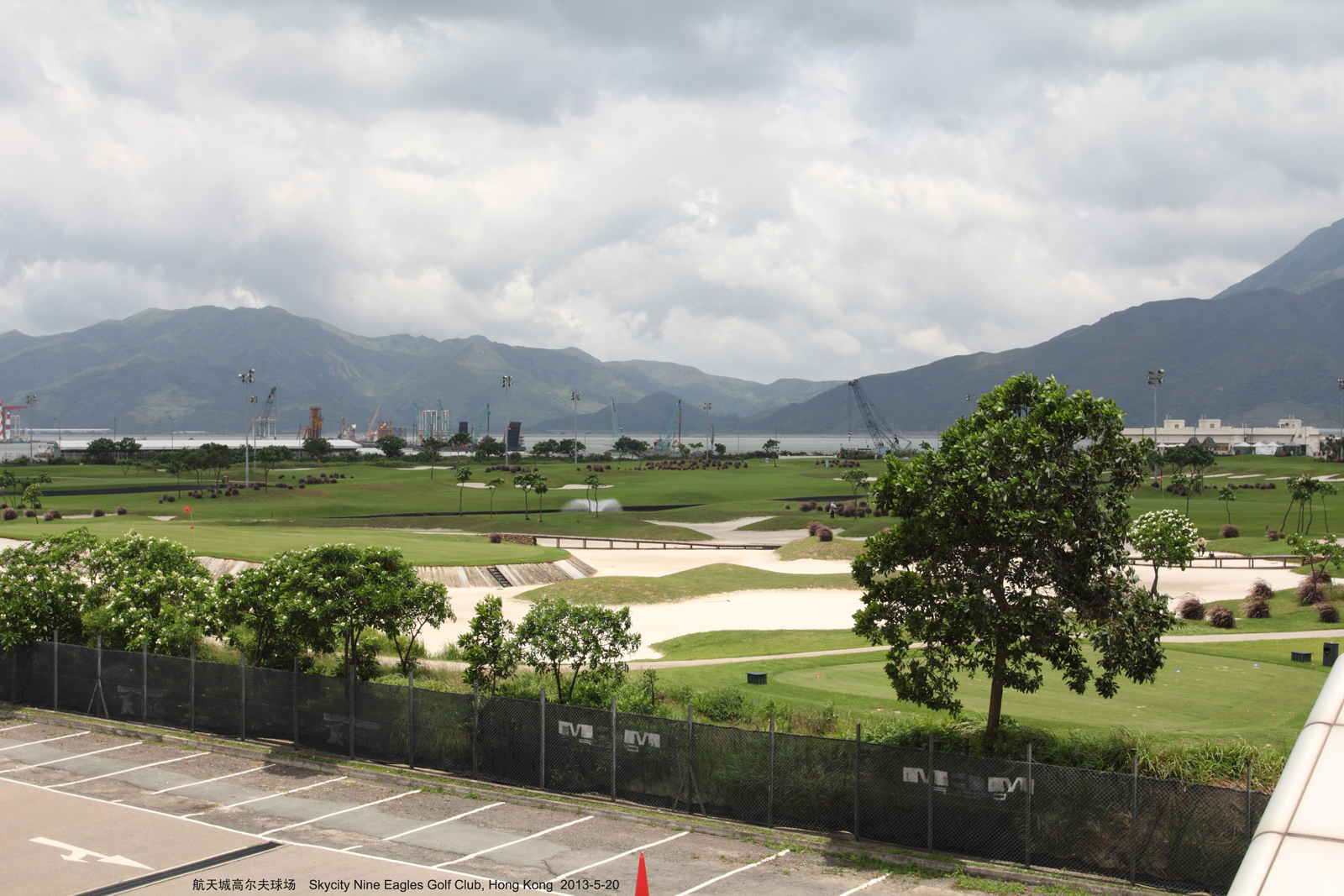
Skycity Nine Eagles Golf Course

The SkyCity Nine Eagles Golf Course was a nine-hole golfing facility. It had seven par 3 holes and two par 4 holes set amidst rolling terrain, undulating greens, and extensive bunkering. The Skycity Nine Eagles Golf Course closed down on 30 July 2015. The Airport Authority said the site, part of the airport's north commercial district, would be used to accommodate a hotel with some 1,000 rooms and retail development of some 200,000 square metres.

== Transport ==
=== From airport ===
Apart from shuttle buses, the fastest way to reach SKYCITY without a car is by taking bus route S56 (operated by Citybus). It costs $3.7HKD per ride.

Airport Express, part of the MTR's Airport Express line, takes only a minute to travel between AsiaWorld–Expo and the Airport. It cost's HK$5.5 for Octopus users and HK$6 for others. However, it requires a 5-minute walk to reach SKYCITY.

Automated People Mover is the current People mover in use at the airport and only operates within the terminal and Skypier. After completion of SkyCity, the Hong Kong International Airport Automated People Mover will be extended to Terminal 2 (SkyPlaza).

=== From other areas of Hong Kong ===
Because SkyCity is located at Chek Lap Kok, the island Hong Kong International Airport is on, it is easy to reach from other areas of the territory.

The Airport Express can be taken from Kowloon, Hong Kong, and Tsing Yi stations. In addition, the Tung Chung line can be taken from Tung Chung to the same stations (plus others) via buses to Tung Chung at a cheaper price than the Airport Express.

The buses that serve the Airport are also options, including the A21 from Hung Hom in Kowloon, which travels to both the Airport and the AsiaWorld-Expo.

The common taxis that service Kowloon, Hong Kong, and Lantau are a common way to get to SkyCity.

== See also ==
- List of shopping centres in Hong Kong
