= Chek Lap Kok =

Island in New Territories, Hong Kong

Native name: 赤鱲角
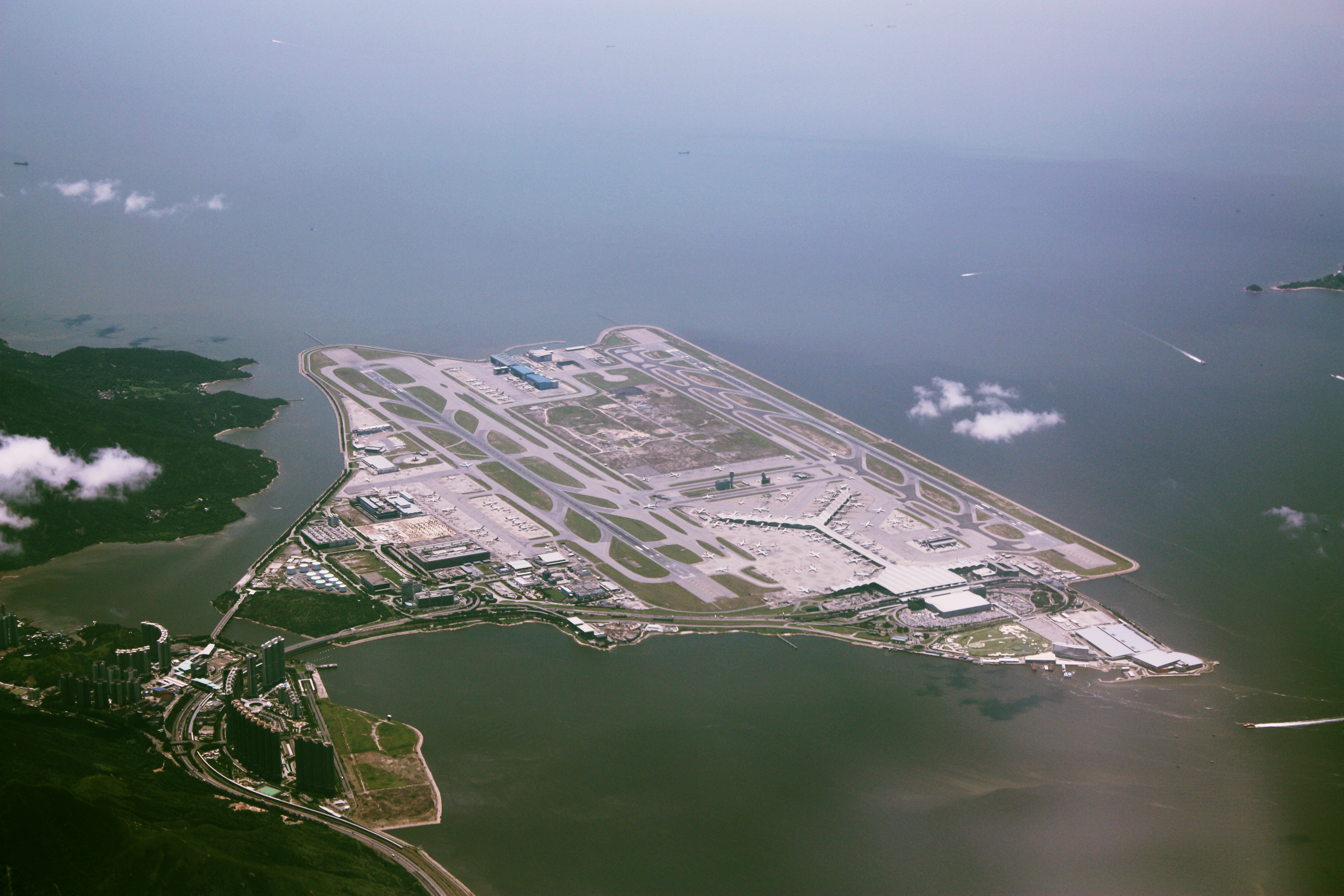
- Aerial view of the airport island in 2010

- Location of Chek Lap Kok in Hong Kong

Geography
- Location: North of Lantau Island
- Coordinates: 22°18′19.1″N 113°55′18.6″E
- Area: 21.08 km^{2} (8.14 sq mi)
- Length: 4 km (2.5 mi)

Administration
- Hong Kong

Chek Lap Kok
- Traditional Chinese: 赤鱲角
- Simplified Chinese: 赤𫚭角
- Literal meaning: Red Perch Cape
Transcriptions
Standard Mandarin
- Hanyu Pinyin: Chìlièjiǎo
- Bopomofo: ㄔˋ ㄌㄧㄝˋ ㄐㄧㄠˇ
- Wade–Giles: Ch‘ih^{4}-lieh^{4}-chiao^{3}
- IPA: [ʈʂʰɨ̂.ljê.tɕjàʊ]
Yue: Cantonese
- Yale Romanization: Cheklaahpgok
- Jyutping: cek3 laap6 gok3
- IPA: [tsʰɛk̚˧.lap̚˨.kɔk̚˧]

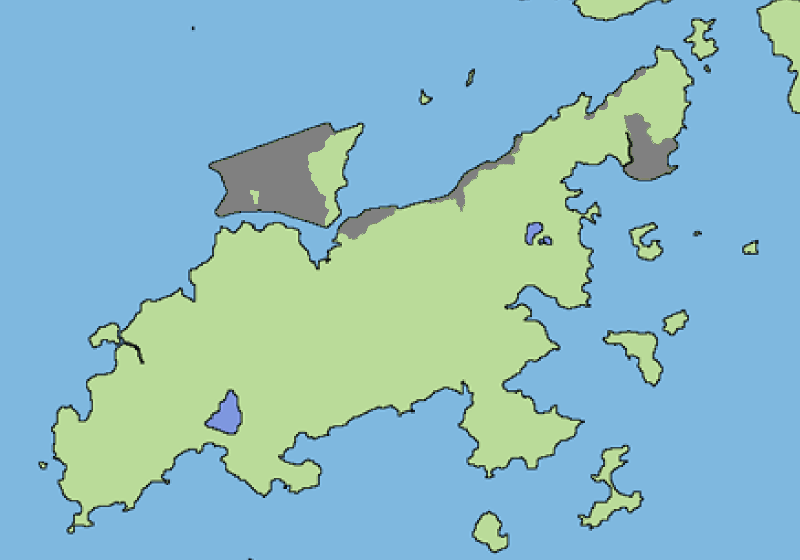
Map showing the reclaimed land of Lantau Island, Lam Chau and Chek Lap Kok.

Chek Lap Kok is an island in the western waters of Hong Kong's New Territories which is home to the Hong Kong International Airport. Initially a hilly 4-square-kilometre (1.5 sq mi) island, it was flattened and greatly expanded via land reclamation into its current size of 12.48 square kilometres (4.82 sq mi) during 1992–1996 as part of the airport's construction, absorbing the nearby island of Lam Chau in the process. Due to its location, the airport is popularly referred to as Chek Lap Kok Airport to distinguish it from the former Hong Kong International Airport, now commonly known as Kai Tak Airport; conversely, the post-reclamation Chek Lap Kok is sometimes referred to as Airport Island, since two-thirds of the expanded island is made out of reclaimed land and it also encompasses the historic Lam Chau.

Hong Kong SkyCity, a business and entertainment complex, is also located on Chek Lap Kok. It includes AsiaWorld–Expo, a convention and exhibition centre, which opened in 2005. Cathay Pacific City, the head office of Cathay Pacific; HAECO, and formerly Hong Kong Airlines are also located on the island.

== Name ==
The name of the island may be derived from the bareness of the island ('da chek lak'), that the original shape of the island resembles the Pagrus ('chek lap', 赤鱲), or that the fish was once abundant in its vicinity.

== Geography ==
The island is located north of Lantau Island off Ma Wan Chung and Tung Chung. Before the building of the airport platform, it was a small and hilly island, about 4 kilometres (2.5 mi) long, with an area of 3.02 square kilometres (1.17 sq mi) (other sources mention 2.8 square kilometres (1.1 sq mi)). The southern end of the island formed a small peninsula, which has been left largely undeveloped. This area is facing Tung Chung and is now named Scenic Hill. It is the site of the Ancient Kiln Park and the Airport Island Angle Station of the Ngong Ping 360 cable car.

As of 2026, the island has been expanded to 21.08 km², with the third runway being constructed in 2022 as part of the Hong Kong International Airport Master Plan 2030.

== History ==
The island has been inhabited on and off since the Middle Neolithic period 6,000 years ago.

During the 19th and 20th centuries, the inhabitants of the island practiced farming, including rice cultivation, and quarrying.

At the time of the 1911 census, the population of Chek Lap Kok was 77. The number of males was 55. The population was about 200 in the 1950s, rising sharply in the 1960s. The population later declined, with some 20 families remaining on the island when the plan for the construction of a new airport was announced in the early 1990s.

Archeological surveys and investigations were conducted on the island starting in the late 1970s. A salvage archaeology project started in October 1990.

The original farming and fishing villages on the island were relocated to Chek Lap Kok New Village aka. Chek Lap Kok San Tsuen (赤鱲角新村) near Tung Chung on Lantau Island. A Tin Hau Temple had been built in 1823 at the north east of the island. The entire temple was built of granite quarried on the island. It was dismantled in 1991 and rebuilt in 1994 at its present location. Chek Lap Kok San Tsuen is a recognized village under the New Territories Small House Policy.

Also, Romer's tree frog (Philautus romeri), a unique species of finger-sized frog found only in Hong Kong, was relocated from Chek Lap Kok to new habitats on Lantau Island before construction of the airport.

In 2022, a third runway at Hong Kong Airport was built as part of the Hong Kong International Airport Master Plan 2030.

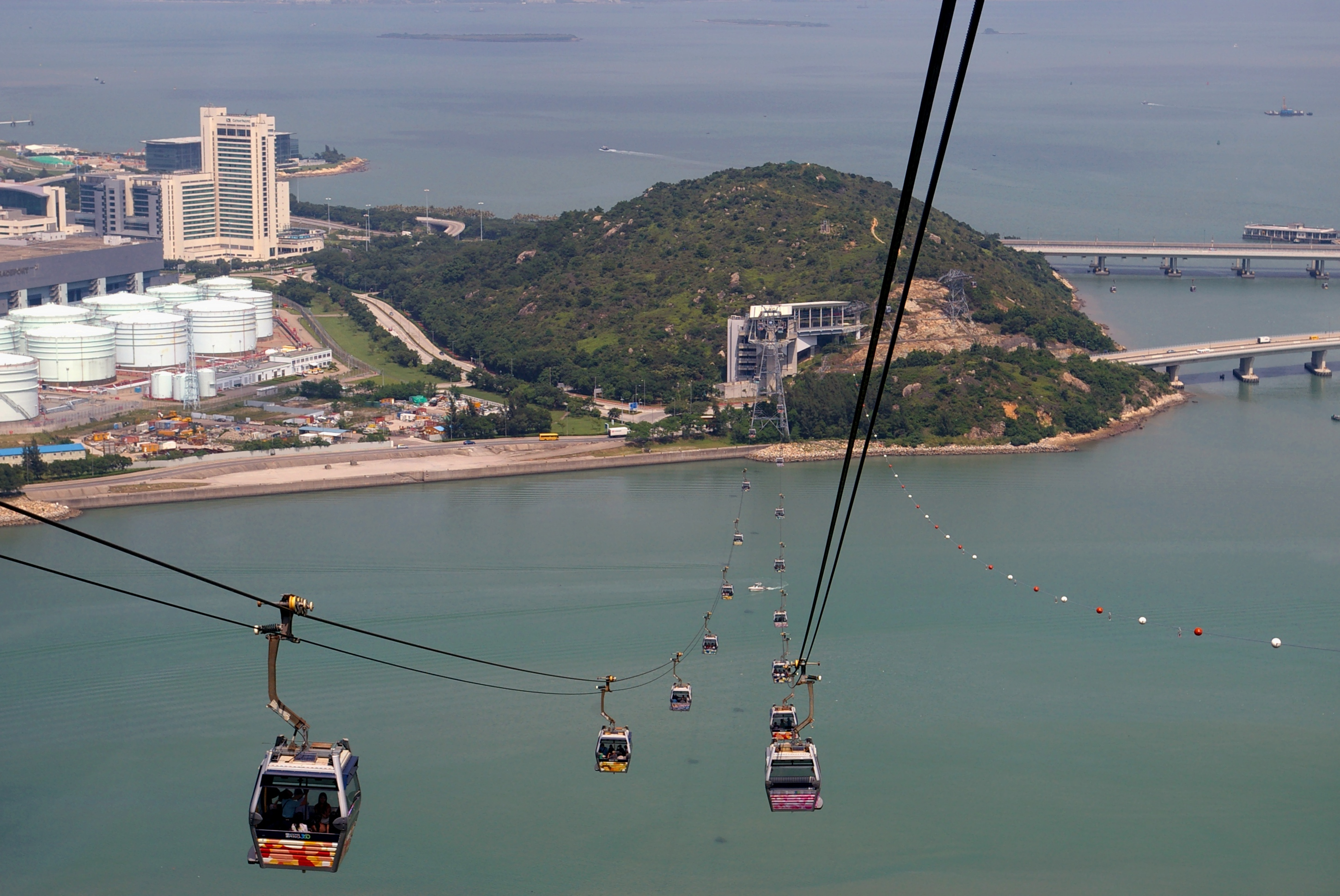
View of the Airport Island Angle Station of the Ngong Ping 360 cable car system built on Scenic Hill, the unlevelled peninsula in the south of Chek Lap Kok.

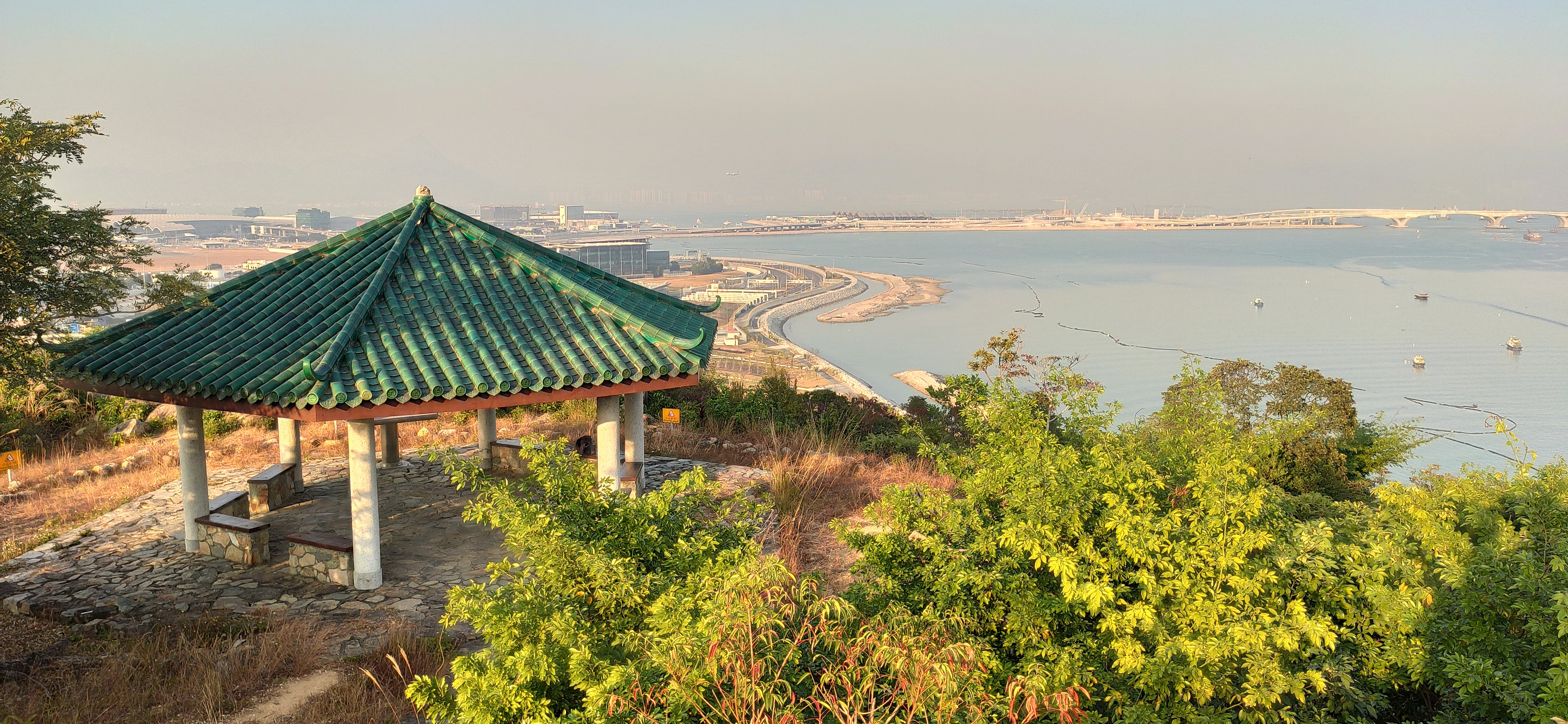
Scenic Hill Pavilion

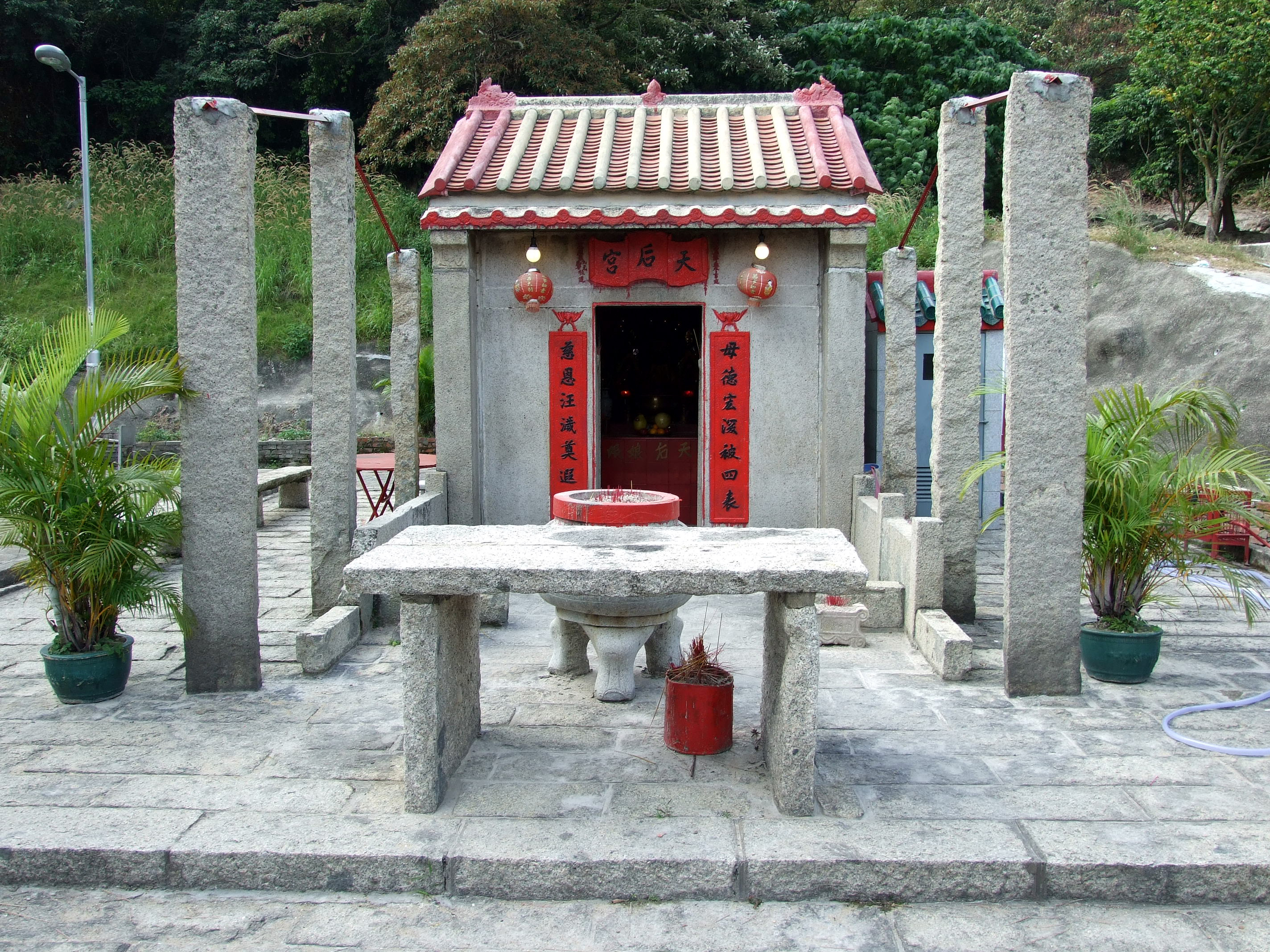
Rebuilt Tin Hau Temple in the new Chek Lap Kok Village.

== Climate ==
Climate data for Hong Kong International Airport (Averages and extremes, 1998–present)
| Month | Jan | Feb | Mar | Apr | May | Jun | Jul | Aug | Sep | Oct | Nov | Dec | Year |
|---|---|---|---|---|---|---|---|---|---|---|---|---|---|
| Record high °C (°F) | 27.2 (81.0) | 29.6 (85.3) | 31.4 (88.5) | 33.5 (92.3) | 37.6 (99.7) | 36.6 (97.9) | 38.3 (100.9) | 37.8 (100.0) | 37.4 (99.3) | 34.2 (93.6) | 33.4 (92.1) | 29.6 (85.3) | 38.3 (100.9) |
| Mean daily maximum °C (°F) | 19.4 (66.9) | 20.9 (69.6) | 23.5 (74.3) | 27.2 (81.0) | 30.3 (86.5) | 32.0 (89.6) | 33.0 (91.4) | 32.9 (91.2) | 32.0 (89.6) | 29.8 (85.6) | 25.8 (78.4) | 21.2 (70.2) | 27.3 (81.1) |
| Daily mean °C (°F) | 16.3 (61.3) | 17.8 (64.0) | 20.2 (68.4) | 24.0 (75.2) | 27.2 (81.0) | 29.0 (84.2) | 29.8 (85.6) | 29.6 (85.3) | 28.7 (83.7) | 26.5 (79.7) | 22.5 (72.5) | 18.0 (64.4) | 24.1 (75.4) |
| Mean daily minimum °C (°F) | 13.7 (56.7) | 15.3 (59.5) | 17.7 (63.9) | 21.6 (70.9) | 24.7 (76.5) | 26.6 (79.9) | 27.2 (81.0) | 26.9 (80.4) | 26.2 (79.2) | 24.1 (75.4) | 19.9 (67.8) | 15.2 (59.4) | 21.6 (70.9) |
| Record low °C (°F) | 2.9 (37.2) | 6.0 (42.8) | 7.7 (45.9) | 12.2 (54.0) | 17.5 (63.5) | 20.4 (68.7) | 23.6 (74.5) | 23.5 (74.3) | 20.2 (68.4) | 15.9 (60.6) | 8.8 (47.8) | 4.8 (40.6) | 2.9 (37.2) |
| Average precipitation mm (inches) | 29.6 (1.17) | 34.2 (1.35) | 65.8 (2.59) | 155.5 (6.12) | 246.6 (9.71) | 426.2 (16.78) | 272.5 (10.73) | 335.5 (13.21) | 214.5 (8.44) | 38.4 (1.51) | 41.8 (1.65) | 41.2 (1.62) | 1,901.8 (74.88) |
| Average rainy days (≥ 0.5 mm) | 3.3 | 4.7 | 6.7 | 8.3 | 12.4 | 16.5 | 15.3 | 13.6 | 9.8 | 3.6 | 3.7 | 3.8 | 101.7 |
| Average relative humidity (%) | 67 | 73 | 74 | 76 | 75 | 76 | 74 | 75 | 71 | 65 | 65 | 61 | 71 |
Source: Hong Kong Observatory

== Education ==
Most of Lantau Island, including Chek Lap Kok New Village, is in Primary One Admission (POA) School Net 98, which contains multiple aided schools on Lantau Island; no government primary schools are in this net.
