= Asia Airfreight Terminal =

Chinese logistics company

Asia Airfreight Terminal Company Limited 亞洲空運中心有限公司
- Type: Consortium
- Industry: Logistics
- Founded: 1998; 28 years ago
- Headquarters: 10 Chun Ping Road, Chek Lap Kok, Hong Kong
- Area served: Hong Kong
- Key people: Executive Director: Mr. Andrew Lim
- Owner: SATS Ltd; Eastern Option Limited; Torres Investments; Keppel Telecommunications & Transportation; Federal Express
- Website: Asia Airfreight Terminal

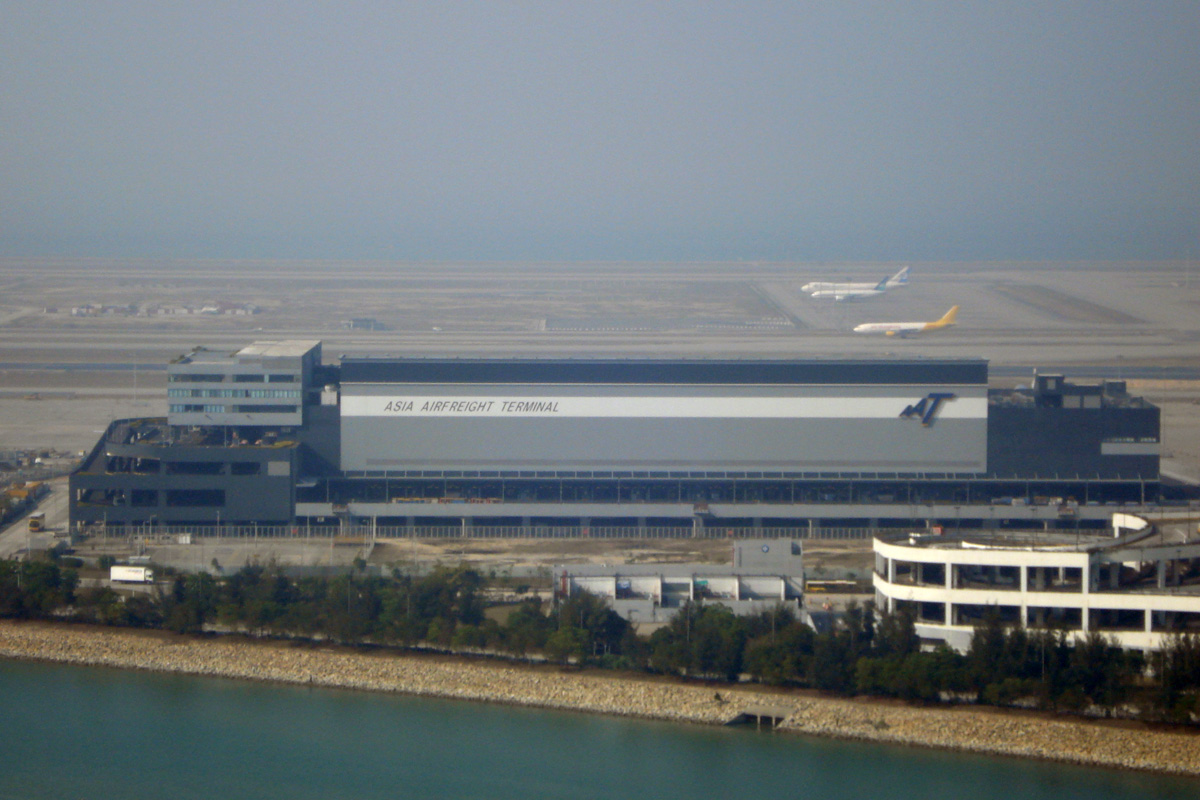
Asia Airfreight Terminal

Asia Airfreight Terminal (AAT) (Chinese: 亞洲空運中心有限公司) is an air cargo terminal based at the Hong Kong International Airport in Chek Lap Kok, New Territories, Hong Kong.

AAT has two terminals, Terminal 1 and Terminal 2. Its cargo terminal has a total area of 80,000 m^{2} (860,000 sq ft) and its warehouses occupy a total area of 166,000 m^{2} (1,790,000 sq ft). AAT provides a handling capacity of 1.5 million tons per annum and is one of the world's leading air cargo terminal operators. It is the second largest cargo handler in Hong Kong by cargo handling volume, after HACTL's SuperTerminal 1.

== Shareholders ==
AAT is a consortium comprising five shareholders.

- SATS Ltd
- Eastern Option Limited (A subsidiary of China Merchants Holdings (International))
- Torres Investments (A subsidiary of Kerry Properties)
- Keppel Telecommunications & Transportation
- Federal Express
