= AFFC =

AFFC may refer to:

- A Feast for Crows, a novel by George R. R. Martin
- African Federation of Film Critics, founded in 2004
- Appleby Frodingham F.C., an English football club
- Airport Freight Forwarding Centre, a warehousing and office facility in Hong Kong International Airport
- Albert Foundry F.C., a Northern Irish football club
