= Third runway =

Third runway may refer to:

- Startbahn 18 West, Frankfurt Airport, Rüsselsheim am Main, Hesse, Germany
- Expansion of Heathrow Airport, Borough of Hillingdon, Greater London, England, United Kingdom
- Hong Kong International Airport Master Plan 2030, Chek Lap Kok, the New Territories, Hong Kong

See also

- Perth Airport § Third runway
- Ninoy Aquino International Airport § Third runway plan
- List of airports with triple takeoff/landing capability
