= SuperTerminal 1 =

Air cargo terminal in Hong Kong

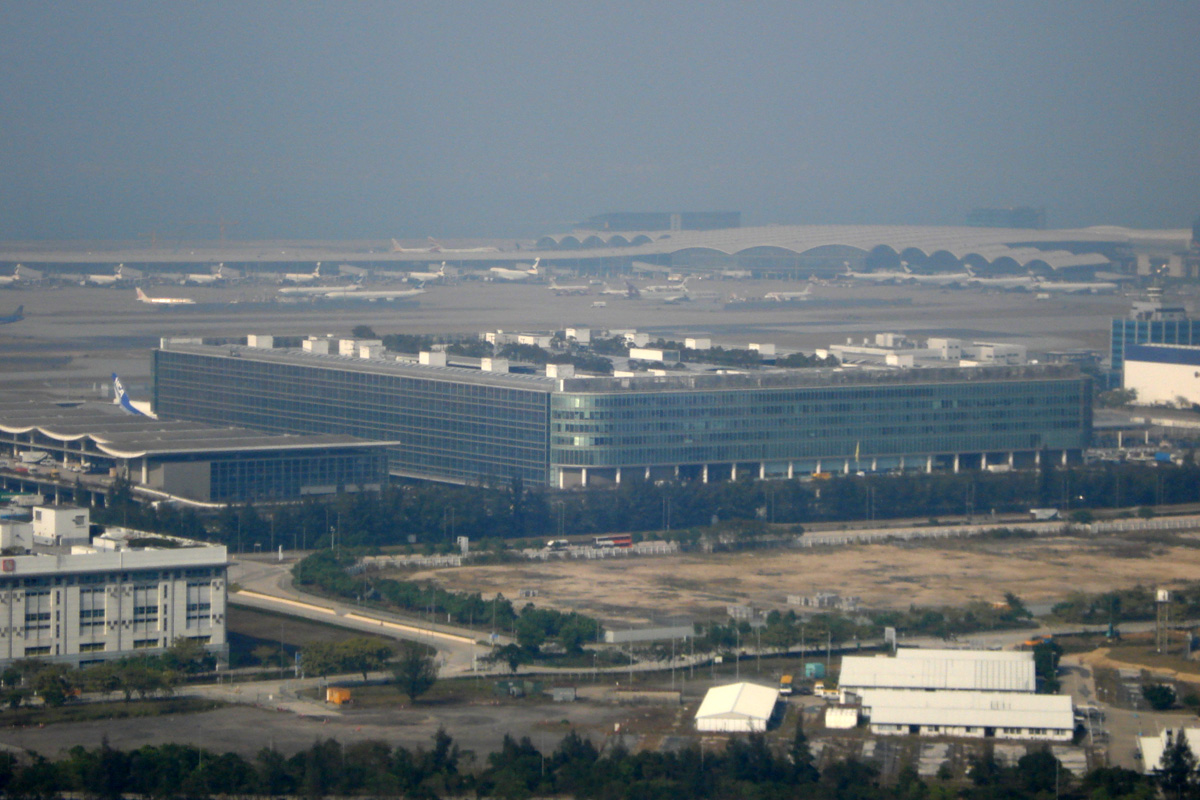
SuperTerminal 1

SuperTerminal 1 (Chinese: 超級一號貨站) is the largest multi-level air cargo terminal in the world located at southeast corner of the Hong Kong International Airport in Chek Lap Kok, New Territories, Hong Kong. It has the area of over 170,000 m^{2} (1,800,000 sq ft) and consists of "Main Terminal Building" and "Express Centre". It is now owned and operated by Hong Kong Air Cargo Terminals Limited (HACTL).

It was designed by British architect Sir Norman Foster and built in 1998. The building cost US$1 billion and can handle 3,500,000 tonnes (3,400,000 long tons; 3,900,000 short tons) of cargo per year.
