= Todd Salimuchai =

Todd Salimuchai (born c. 1970) is a self-described Thai or Burmese former opium poppy farmer, best known as the only man to ever attempt an aircraft hijacking at the Hong Kong International Airport.

== Early life ==
Like many members of tribal peoples in border areas of Southeast Asia, Salimuchai has no identity documents attesting to his birth date or place of origin, making him effectively stateless. Any information about his early life comes only from his own statements. He says he is a Lisu tribesman from a 200-person village called Hazen in the Golden Triangle on the border of Thailand and Myanmar. His parents died when he was young, leaving Salimuchai and his two elder brothers as orphans. His native language is Lisu; he learned some English as a young man from American soldiers and other travelling expatriates as a child. He also says he learned how to fly small helicopters. Though he claims not to have used drugs himself, his village was heavily involved in the drug trade, growing poppies for sale to a Hong Kong drug lord who would come with payment once every year.

One year, instead of cash payment, the drug lord brought a check for US$800,000. The villagers reluctantly and suspiciously accepted the check, but banks refused to encash it. The village elders decided to send Salimuchai and another young man to Hong Kong to search for the drug lord and resolve the issue. Salimuchai and his accomplice were flown by helicopter to a port and became stowaways on a Hong Kong-bound freighter. Disorientated after their landing in Hong Kong and unable to speak the local language, they searched for the drug lord fruitlessly for three months while staying in a safe house. Salimuchai was eventually arrested during a police identity check in Wan Chai.

== In and out of prison ==
Following his arrest, Salimuchai was sent to Victoria Prison. Hong Kong Immigration Department officers interviewed him, but due to his limited English made little headway in determining who he was or whence he came. They ordered his continued detention pending removal to "a place to be specified". That place turned out to be mainland China; in early 2000, he was placed on a bus with mainland immigration offenders and sent to Shenzhen, told by police officers that he was going home. While in the mainland, he claims to have suffered electric shock torture and beatings over a period of forty days in two different jails. He was also given a Chinese name. Afterwards, he was deported back to Hong Kong, and again detained.

In May 2000, Salimuchai was released from immigration detention. With just HK$2,000 which his friend had left for him at the safe-house, Salimuchai had no way of putting a roof over his head. He ended up homeless, sleeping on the street and collecting paper and cans in Wan Chai to sell to recyclers and earn money for his survival.

== Hijacking attempt and reimprisonment ==
On 31 July 2000, Salimuchai took a fake pistol and went to the Hong Kong International Airport, planning to hijack a helicopter and fly himself back home. Upon arrival, he snuck in using a loading dock staff entrance, forced his way through security into the airside area, and took a female cleaner hostage. However, he saw that the helicopters were far away and much larger than the ones he knew how to fly. Quickly changing his plans, he instead boarded a Cathay Pacific aircraft. The aircraft, which had just arrived from Taipei as flight CX451 and was being prepared to fly to Paris and then London as flight CX261 at 11:35 PM, was empty at the time. After a two-hour siege, Salimuchai surrendered to police. No one was injured in the course of the incident; however, 372 passengers' travel plans were disrupted, and Cathay Pacific had to pay for 363 of them to be put up in local hotels.

At the time, security guards at Hong Kong International Airport checkpoints were unarmed; in the aftermath of Salimuchai's hijacking (and another incident the next day in which a 19-year-old airport worker carried a fake gun and five bullets into the airport's cargo centre in what he claimed was an attempt to play a prank on a colleague) it was proposed that they be armed. Salimuchai was sent to Tsuen Wan District Court. There, he pleaded guilty to charges of false imprisonment and using a fake firearm with intent to commit an offence, and in February 2001 was sentenced to five years in prison. In prison, he came into contact with many former drug users, and developed a sense of remorse, as he felt he had contributed to their problems. In 2004, he wrote to the Immigration Department to declare that he wanted to integrate into the Hong Kong community. He attained early release in December 2004 with the aid of a guarantor.

== Post-release ==
Salimuchai's troubles did not end with his release from prison. The Immigration Department took his fingerprints and tried to verify his identity with various countries in order to arrange for his deportation, but failed. 17 countries refused him entry as an asylum-seeker, mainly due to his criminal record. He furthermore applied for Comprehensive Social Security Assistance from the Labour and Welfare Bureau, but was rejected as he was not a Hong Kong resident. A friend of his from prison initially offered him a place to live and economic support, but Salimuchai broke off contact with him when the friend tried to draw him back to a life of crime. He applied for refugee status at the United Nations High Commissioner for Refugees, who gave him temporary support while his application was pending.

However, in 2005 the UNHCR rejected Salimuchai's application because he did not qualify as a refugee; he was not in fear of persecution in his home country, but instead actively sought to return there and was blocked because he could not convince any country to grant him admission. After the rejection of his refugee claim, the UNHCR cut off their support for Salimuchai as well. Prohibited from working by the Immigration Department, Salimuchai relied on charity from private benefactors (including an unidentified high-level government official) who gave him about HK$1,000/month, as well as local non-governmental organisations such as Inner City Mission, which provided him with free meals. He applied to the Immigration Department for permission to work, hoping to be able to repay the kindness of his guarantor, but was rejected. In November 2005, he appealed the rejection directly to then-Chief Executive Donald Tsang, but his petition went unanswered.

Salimuchai's case attracted attention from various local and international organisations such as the Belgium-based Human Rights Without Frontiers; human rights lawyer Mark Daly began working with Salimuchai on his case. In late 2007, Salimuchai filed a suit in the High Court against the immigration department. The suit, the first of its kind to be brought in Hong Kong, alleged inhumane treatment and violation of the Hong Kong Bill of Rights Ordinance (1991) and the 1954 Convention Relating to the Status of Stateless Persons. He also sought to overturn the prohibition against employment that had been imposed on him. The immigration department for their part complained that Salimuchai had been uncooperative in telling them where he was from, hindering their efforts to aid him. In April 2008, Salimuchai reached an amicable settlement with the government, in which the Immigration Department gave him permission to take up employment.
