= Airport Freight Forwarding Centre =

Hong Kong logistics company

Airport Freight Forwarding Centre Company Limited 機場空運中心有限公司
- Type: Privately owned company
- Industry: Air transportation
- Founded: 1998; 28 years ago
- Headquarters: 2 Chun Wan Road, Chek Lap Kok, New Territories, Hong Kong
- Area served: Hong Kong
- Parent: Sun Hung Kai Properties
- Website: Airport Freight Forwarding Centre

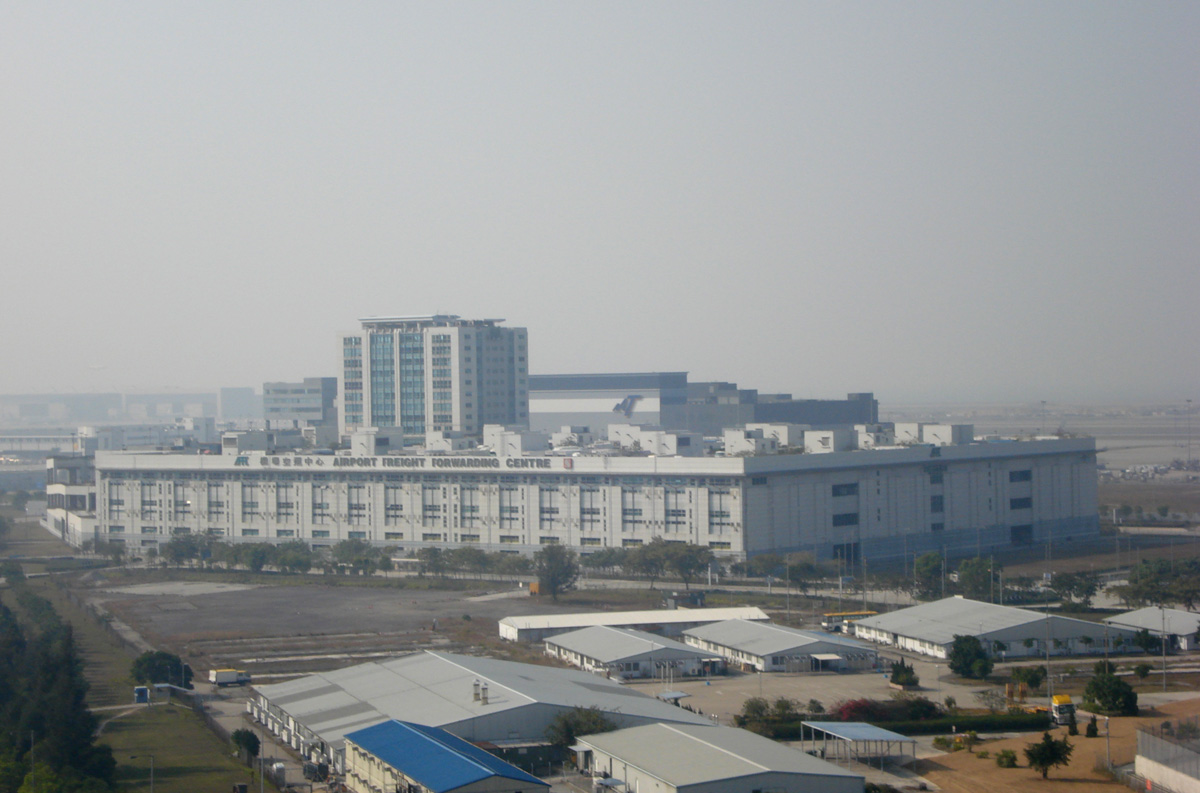
Airport Freight Forwarding Centre

Airport Freight Forwarding Centre (AFFC) (Chinese: 機場空運中心) is the leading warehouse service provider in Hong Kong and the only warehousing and office facility at the Hong Kong International Airport in Chek Lap Kok, New Territories, Hong Kong. AFFC is a wholly owned subsidiary of Sun Hung Kai Properties, one of the largest property developers in Hong Kong. It offers tenants more than 1,300,000 square feet (120,000 m^{2}) of storage space and 175,000 square feet (16,300 m^{2}) of class A office space.

== Link ==
- Airport Freight Forwarding Centre
