= Hong Kong International Airport =

Airport in Chek Lap Kok, Hong Kong

Hong Kong International Airport 香港國際機場

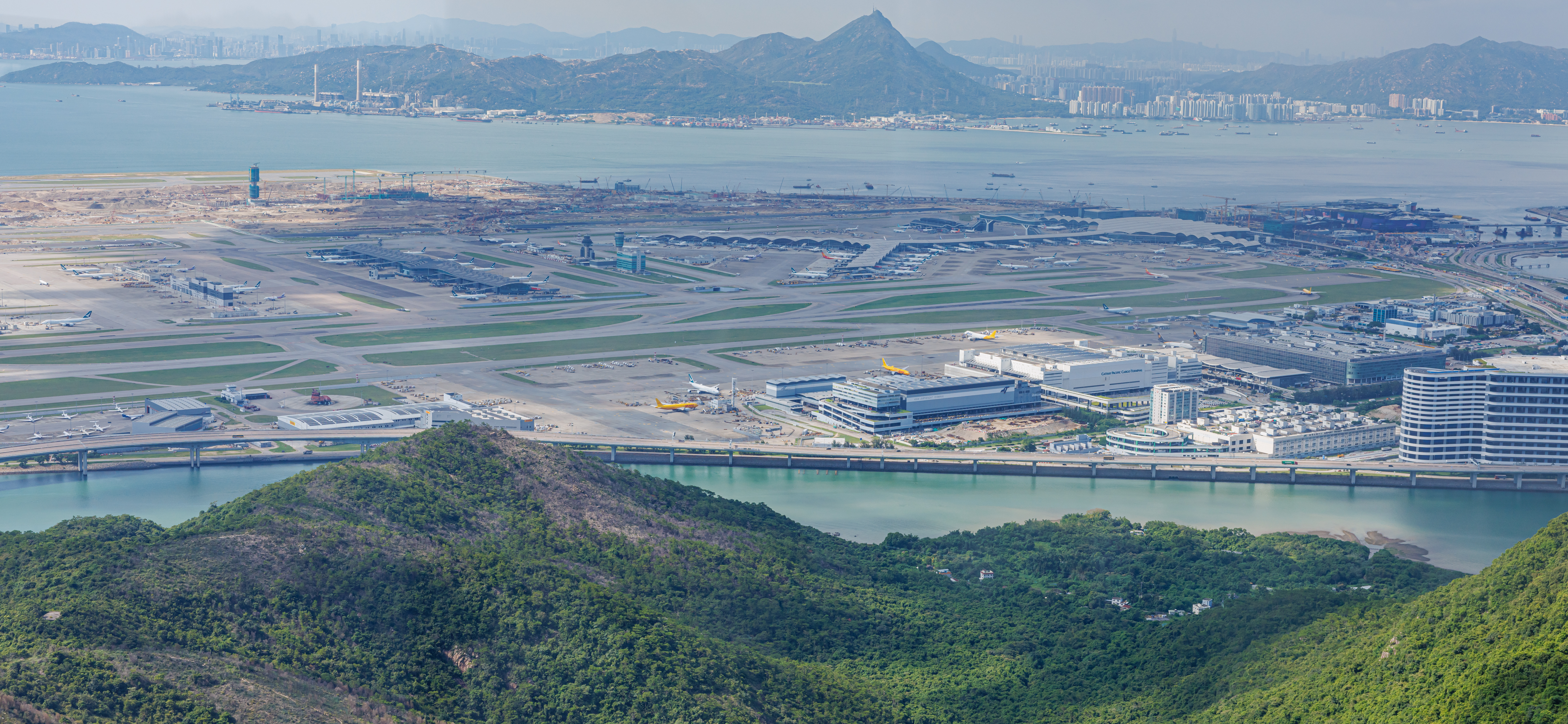
- IATA: HKG; ICAO: VHHH

Summary
- Airport type: Public
- Owner/Operator: Airport Authority Hong Kong
- Serves: Hong Kong, Pearl River Delta
- Location: Chek Lap Kok, New Territories, Hong Kong
- Opened: 6 July 1998; 28 years ago
- Hub for: Air Hong Kong; Cathay Pacific; DHL Aviation; Greater Bay Airlines; HK Express; Hong Kong Airlines; Kalitta Air; Polar Air Cargo; UPS Airlines
- Focus city for: Air China; China Eastern Airlines
- Time zone: HKT (UTC+08:00)
- Elevation AMSL: 8.5 m (28 ft)
- Coordinates: 22°18′32″N 113°54′52″E
- Website: www.hongkongairport.com

Maps
- Location in Hong Kong
- Interactive map of Hong Kong International Airport

Runways
Direction	Length		Surface
Direction	m	ft	Surface
07L/25R (Note: 3,800 metres (12,467 feet) is the actual length. displaced threshold is not count as part of a runway. The official website also cites the runway length as 3, 800m.)	3,800	12,467	Asphalt
07C/25C (Note: 3,800 metres (12,467 feet) is the actual runway length. The length with the displaced threshold is 4,230 metres (13,878 feet).)	3,800	12,467	Asphalt
07R/25L	3,800	12,467	Asphalt

Statistics (2026 Jan-June)
- Passengers: 32,800,000 ▲11.7%
- Aircraft movements: 200,685 ▲4.4%
- Cargo (metric tonnes): 2,500,000 ▲4.1%
- Source: Hong Kong International Airport

Hong Kong International Airport
- Traditional Chinese: 香港國際機場
- Simplified Chinese: 香港国际机场
Transcriptions
Standard Mandarin
- Hanyu Pinyin: Xiānggǎng Guójì Jīchǎng
- Bopomofo: ㄒㄧㄤ ㄍㄤˇ ㄍㄨㄛˊ ㄐㄧˋ ㄐㄧ ㄔㄤ
- Wade–Giles: Hsiang^{1}-kang^{3} Kuo^{2}-chi^{4} Chi^{1}-chʻang^{3}
- Tongyong Pinyin: Sianggǎng Guó-jì Ji-chǎng
- Yale Romanization: Syānggǎng Gwójì Jīchǎng
- IPA: [ɕjáŋ.kàŋ kwǒ.tɕî tɕí.ʈʂʰàŋ]
Hakka
- Romanization: Hiong^{1}gong^{3} Get^{5}(or gok^{5})zi^{4} Gi^{1}cong^{2}
Yue: Cantonese
- Yale Romanization: Hēunggóng Gwokjai Gēichèuhng
- Jyutping: hoeng1 gong2 gwok3 zai3 gei1 coeng4
- IPA: [hœŋ˥ kɔŋ˧˥ kʷɔk̚˧ tsɐj˧ kej˥ tsʰœŋ˩]

Chek Lap Kok International Airport
- Traditional Chinese: 赤鱲角國際機場
- Simplified Chinese: 赤𫚭角国际机场
Transcriptions
Standard Mandarin
- Hanyu Pinyin: Chìlièjiǎo Guójì Jīchǎng
- Bopomofo: ㄔˋ ㄌㄧㄝˋ ㄐㄧㄠˇ ㄍㄨㄛˊ ㄐㄧˋ ㄐㄧ ㄔㄤ
- Wade–Giles: Chʻih^{4}-lieh^{4}-chiao^{3} Kuo^{2}-chi^{4} Chi^{1}-chʻang^{3}
- Tongyong Pinyin: Chìh-liè-jiǎo Guó-jì Ji-chǎng
- Yale Romanization: Chr̀lyèjyǎu Gwójì Jīchǎng
- IPA: [ʈʂʰɻ̩̂.ljê.tɕjàʊ kwǒ.tɕî tɕí.ʈʂʰàŋ]
Hakka
- Romanization: Cak^{5}lap^{6}gok^{5} Gi^{1}cong^{2}
Yue: Cantonese
- Yale Romanization: Cheklaahpgok Gwokjai Gēichèuhng
- Jyutping: cek3 laap6 gok3 gwok3 zai3 gei1 coeng4
- IPA: [tsʰɛk̚˧ lap̚˨ kɔk̚˧ kʷɔk̚˧ tsɐj˧ kej˥ tsʰœŋ˩]

Hong Kong International Airport (IATA: HKG, ICAO: VHHH) is an international airport located on the island of Chek Lap Kok in western Hong Kong. It is sometimes referred to Chek Lap Kok Airport to distinguish it from its predecessor, Kai Tak Airport.

Opened in 1998, Hong Kong International Airport is the world's busiest cargo gateway and one of the world's busiest passenger airports. It is also home to one of the world's largest passenger terminal buildings, which was the largest when the airport opened.

The airport is operated by Airport Authority Hong Kong, and has three operational runways, each measuring 3.8 kilometres (2.4 mi) in length. It runs 24 hours a day and is the primary hub for Cathay Pacific, Greater Bay Airlines, Hong Kong Airlines, HK Express, and Air Hong Kong. The airport is one of the hubs of Oneworld, and also one of the Asia-Pacific cargo hubs for UPS Airlines. It is a focus city for Air China and China Eastern Airlines. Ethiopian Airlines, United Airlines and Emirates utilise Hong Kong as a stopover point for their flights.

As of March 2026, Hong Kong International Airport have connections with 80 destinations in 42 countries participating in the Belt and Road Initiative and direct connections to 220 destinations worldwide.

Hong Kong International Airport, which employed about 60,000 people at the start of 2024, is an important contributor to Hong Kong's economy. The economic contribution generated by Hong Kong's air travel industry in 2018 amounted to US$33 billion, 10.2% of Hong Kong's GDP. More than 100 airlines operate flights from the airport to over 180 cities across the globe. In 2024, the airport handled 49.9 million international passengers, making it the 9th busiest airport in the world by international passenger traffic. In 2010, it surpassed Memphis International Airport to become the world's busiest airport by cargo traffic.

== History ==
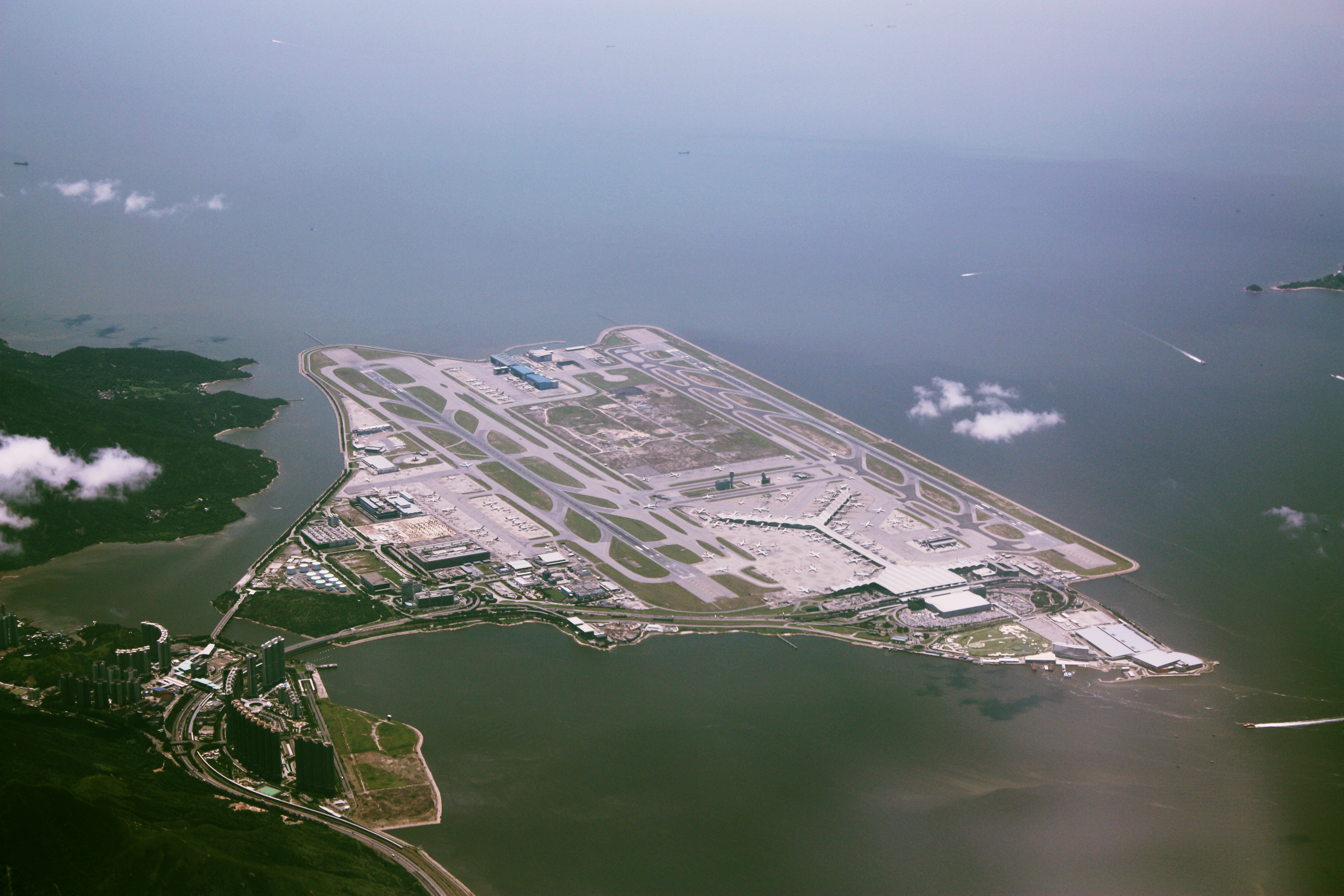
Aerial view of Hong Kong International Airport before the completion of the 3 runway system.

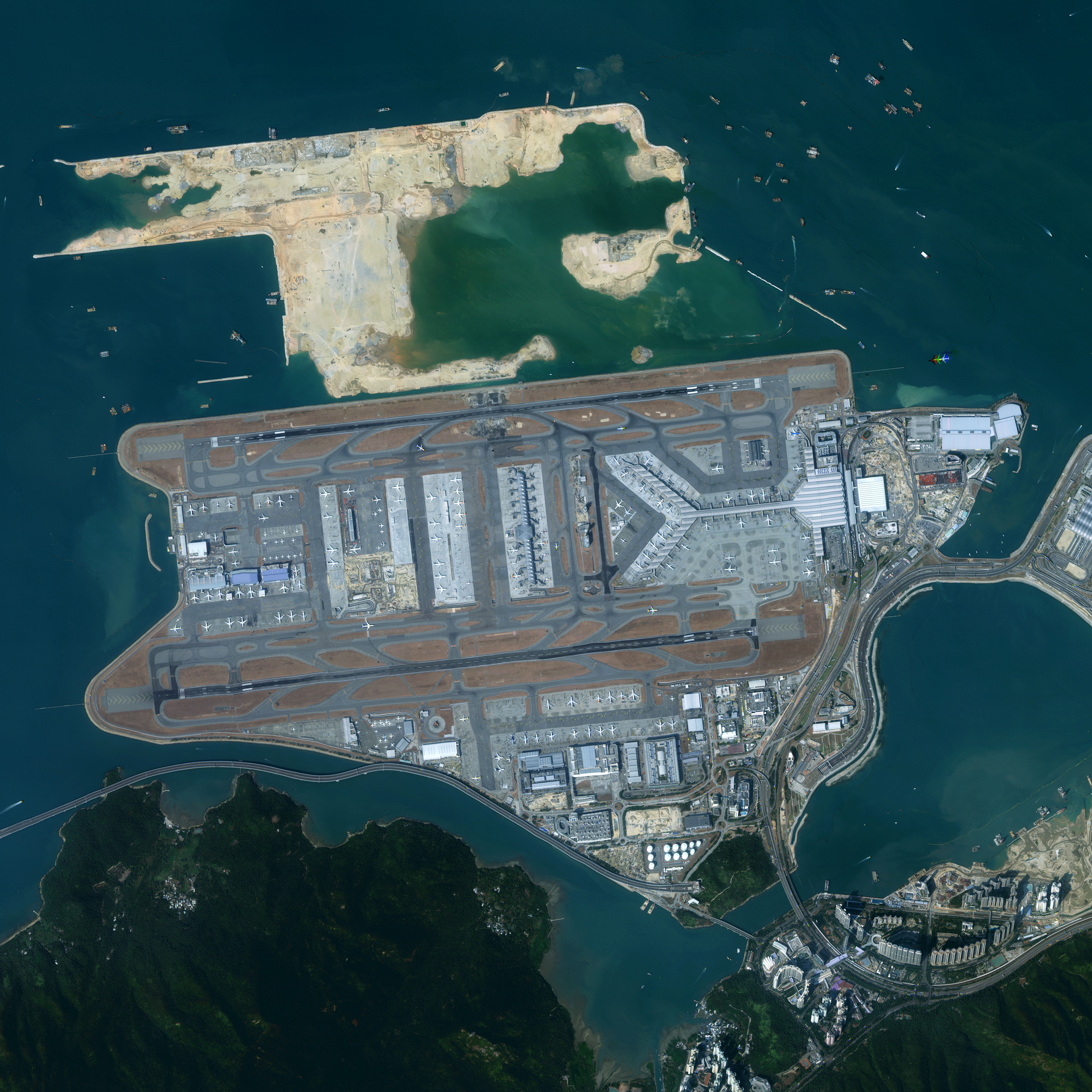
Aerial view during the reclamation work.

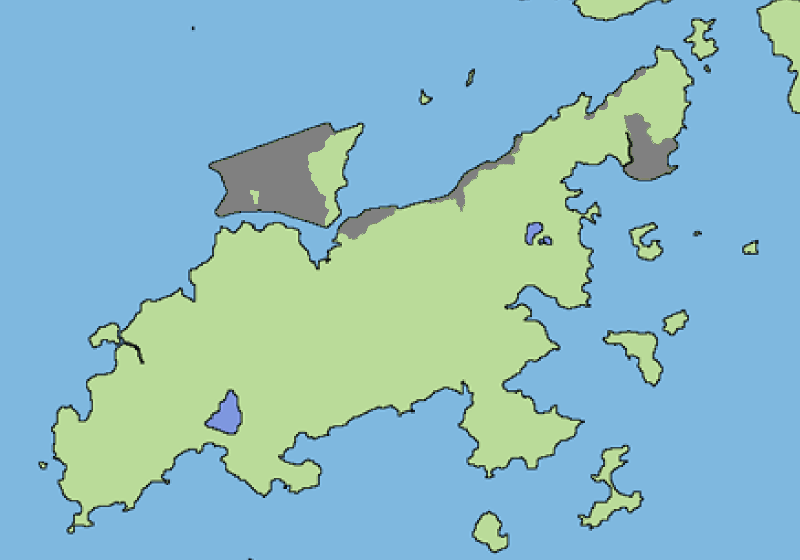
Map showing the reclaimed land of Lantau Island, Lam Chau and Chek Lap Kok before construction of the third runway

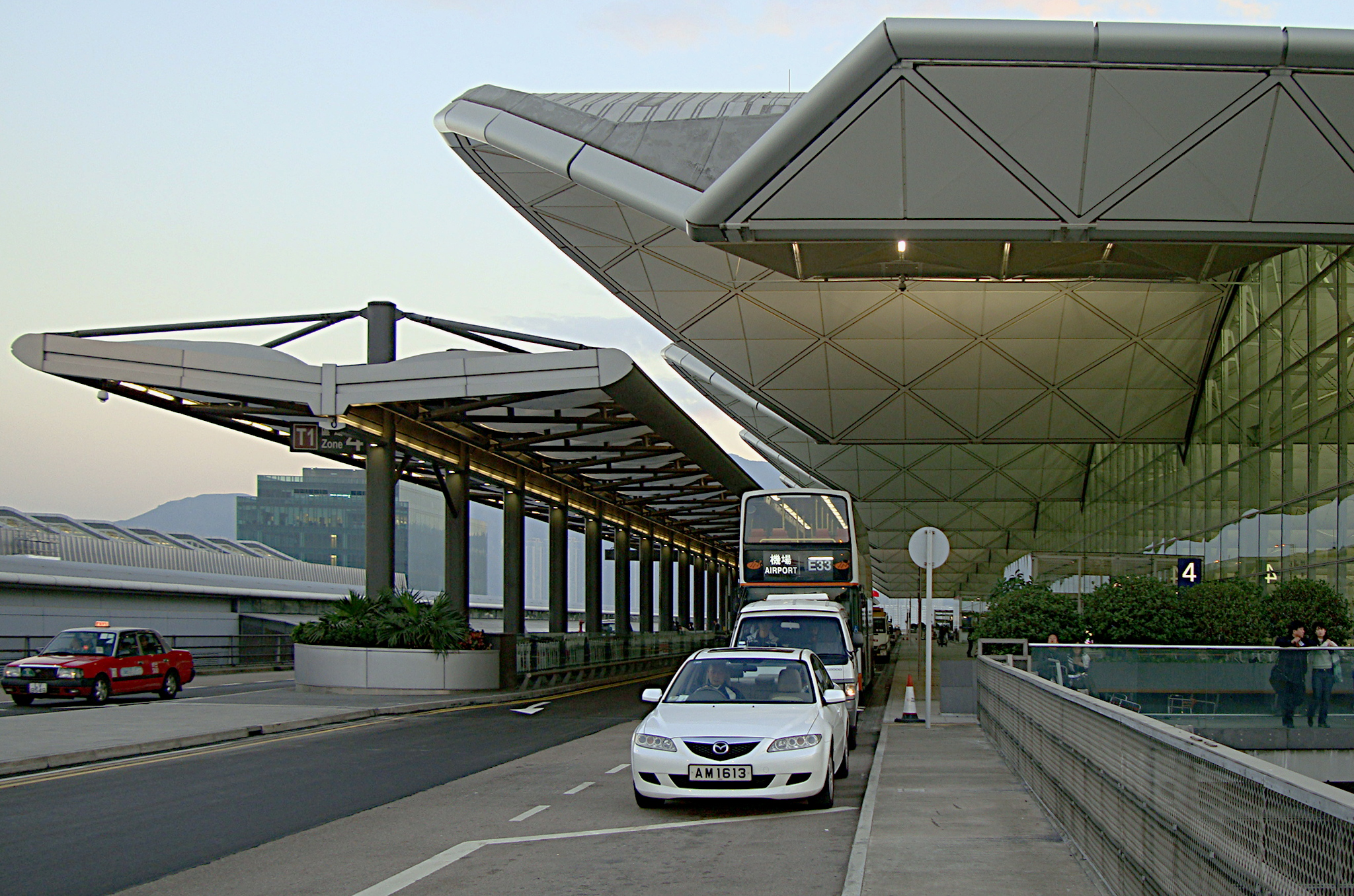
A front view of Hong Kong Airport (2008)

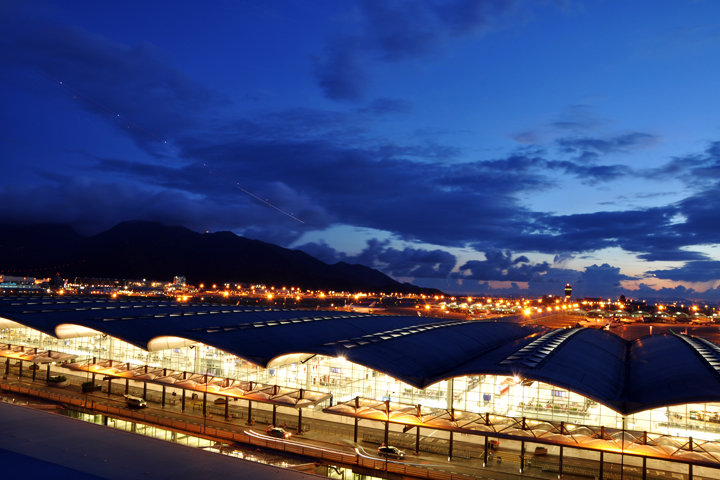
The exterior of Hong Kong International Airport at night

Chek Lap Kok Airport was designed as a replacement for the Kai Tak Airport, built in 1925. Located in the densely built-up Kowloon City District with a single runway extending into Kowloon Bay, Hong Kong Airport had turned on the runway lights for expansion to cope with steadily increasing air traffic. By the 1990s, Kai Tak had become one of the world's busiest airports, being a major hub for multiple passenger airlines along with a major cargo and maintenance hub – it far exceeded its annual passenger and cargo design capacities, and one out of every three flights experienced delays, largely due to a lack of space for aircraft, gates, and a second runway. In addition, noise mitigation measures restricted nighttime flights, as severe noise pollution (exceeding 105 dB(A) in Kowloon City) adversely affected an estimated 340,000 people.

A 1974 planning study by the Civil Aviation and Public Works departments identified the small island of Chek Lap Kok, off Lantau Island, as a possible future airport replacement site. Far from the congested city centre, flight paths would be routed over the South China Sea rather than crowded urban areas, enabling efficient round-the-clock operation of multiple runways. The Chek Lap Kok (CLK) airport master plan and civil engineering studies were completed between 1982 and 1983, respectively. However, in February 1983, the government shelved the project for financial and economic reasons. In 1988, the Port & Airport Development Strategy (PADS) study was undertaken by consultants, headed by Mott MacDonald Hong Kong Limited, reporting in December 1989. This study looked at forecasts for both airport and port traffic to the year 2011 and came up with three recommended strategies for overall strategic development in Hong Kong. One of the three assumed maintaining the existing airport at Kai Tak; a second assumed a possible airport in the Western Harbour between Lantau Island and Hong Kong Island, and the third assumed a new airport at Chek Lap Kok. The consultants produced detailed analyses for each scenario, enabling the government to consider these appraisals for each of the three "Recommended Strategies". In October 1989, the governor of Hong Kong announced to the Legislative Council that a decision had been made on the territory's long-term port and airport development strategy. The strategy was to be adopted that included a replacement airport at Chek Lap Kok and incorporating new container terminals 8 and 9 at Stonecutters Island and east of the Tsing Yi island, respectively.

In the PADS study, the consultants advised that the earliest the airport could be opened was January 1998. However, in reaching the government's decision, this date was changed to January 1997, six months before the handover of Hong Kong to China. Construction of the new airport began in 1991. As construction progressed, an agreement was reached with China that as much as possible of the airport would be completed before the handover to China in July 1997. Former British prime minister, Margaret Thatcher, opened the Tsing Ma Bridge, the main access to Lantau Island and the airport and its supporting community in April 1997. Soon after, the airport itself opened in July 1998.

Hong Kong International Airport was built on a large artificial island formed by flattening and levelling the former Chek Lap Kok and Lam Chau islands (3.02 square kilometres (1.17 sq mi) and 0.08 square kilometres (0.031 square miles) respectively) and reclaiming 9.38 square kilometres (3.62 square miles) of the adjacent seabed. The 12.48-square-kilometre (4.82 sq mi) airport site with its reclamation, added nearly 1% to Hong Kong's total surface area, connecting to the north side of Lantau Island near Tung Chung new town.

Construction of the new airport was only part of the Airport Core Programme, which also involved the construction of new roads and rail links to the airport, with associated bridges and tunnels, and major land reclamation projects on both Hong Kong Island and in Kowloon. The project holds the record for the most expensive airport project ever, according to Guinness World Records. The construction of the new airport was also voted as one of the Top 10 Construction Achievements of the 20th Century at the ConExpo conference in 1999.

The detailed design for the airport terminal was awarded to a consortium led by Mott Connell (the Hong Kong office of UK consultant Mott MacDonald) with BAA PLC as the specialist designers for airport-related aspects, Foster and Partners as the architects, and Ove Arup as the specialist structural designers for the roof. Mott Connell was the designer for the foundations, all other structural components, and the mechanical and electrical work. The sides of the terminals, predominantly glass, were designed to break during high-speed winds, relieving pressure and allowing the terminal to withstand an intense typhoon.

The airport was officially opened in an opening ceremony by the President of China and General Secretary of the Communist Party Jiang Zemin at noon Hong Kong Time on 2 July 1998. Hours later, Air Force One, carrying the president of the United States Bill Clinton, landed at the new airport and became the first foreign visitor to arrive at the new airport. The actual operation of the airport commenced on 6 July 1998, concluding the six-year construction that cost 60 billion US dollars. On that day at 06:25 Hong Kong Time, Cathay Pacific Flight CX 889 from New York JFK Airport became the first commercial flight to land at the airport, pipping the original CX 292 from Rome which was the scheduled as the first arrival. However, the airport had already started to experience some technical difficulties on the first day of opening. The flight information display system (FIDS) had suddenly shut down, causing long delays. Shortly afterwards, the cargo communication link with Kai Tak, where all the necessary data was stored went down. During the same period, someone accidentally deleted an important database for cargo services. This meant that cargo data had to be manually stored. At one point, the airport had to turn away all air cargo and freight headed for and exported from Hong Kong (except food and medical supplies) while it sorted out the huge mess. HKIA simply could not keep up without an automated assistant-computer system. For three to five months after its opening, it suffered various severe organizational, mechanical, and technical problems that almost crippled the airport and its operations. Computer glitches were mostly to blame for the major crisis. Lau Kong-wah, a Hong Kong politician, was quoted saying, "This was meant to be a first-class project, but it has turned into a ninth-class airport and a disgrace. Our airport has become the laughingstock of the world." At one time, the government reopened the cargo terminal at Kai Tak Airport to handle freight traffic because of a breakdown at the new cargo terminal, named Super Terminal One (ST1).

On 31 July 2000, Todd Salimuchai, a regularized illegal immigrant in Hong Kong with no provable nationality, forced his way through a security checkpoint using a fake pistol, took a woman hostage, and boarded a Cathay Pacific aircraft. He was demanded to be flown to Burma, which he claimed was his native country but had refused to admit him due to his lack of documents. He surrendered to the police two and a half hours later.

Besides Terminal 2 (T2), the SkyCity Nine Eagles Golf Course was opened in 2007 whereas the second airport hotel, the Hong Kong SkyCity Marriott Hotel, and a permanent cross-boundary ferry terminal, the Skypier, began operations in 2008 and 2009 respectively. Development around T2 also includes the AsiaWorld-Expo which started operation in late 2005. A second passenger concourse, the North Satellite Concourse (NSC), opened in 2010, followed by the Midfield Concourse in December 2015.

During August 2019, the airport was shut down multiple times as demonstrations were held inside the airport during the 2019–20 Hong Kong protests, over 160 flights were cancelled as both the arrivals and departures sections of the airport were occupied.

The third runway, also known as the North Runway, was opened in July 2022. It is the first part of the Hong Kong International Airport Master Plan 2030 to be implemented. The third runway is 650 hectares in land area, roughly the size of Gibraltar. The Centre Runway and Terminal 2 of the airport were then closed to facilitate construction works, expansion and upgrades. The Centre Runway was reopened on 28 November 2024. Terminal 2, having undergone major expansion, reopened on 27 May 2026.

== Composition ==
Airport layout

Hong Kong International Airport covers an area of 4,707 acres or 1,905 hectares (7.36 sq mi). It has a total of 88 boarding gates, including 77 equipped with jet bridges gates (1–21, 23–36, 40–50, 60–71, 201–219) and 11 virtual gates (228–230, 511–513, 520–524) where passengers are transported to aircraft by apron buses.

In addition to Chek Lap Kok, the airport occupies what was Lam Chau.

=== Terminal 1 (T1) ===
Terminal 1 (T1) of the HKIA, with an area measuring 570,000 square metres (6,100,000 sq ft), is one of the largest passenger airport terminal buildings in the world, after the likes of Dubai International Airport Terminal 3 and Beijing Capital International Airport Terminal 3.

In late 2021, the air side of T1 started segregating mainland Chinese flights and other international flights into two separate zones, "Green Zone" and "Orange Zone", to reduce the risk of cross infection of novel coronavirus between travellers and airport workers serving different destinations. However, this idea was scrapped soon after COVID.

On 1 November 2022, the sky bridge opened as part of a wider HK$9 billion airport upgrade, connecting T1 to the T1 Satellite Concourse (T1S). Lined with glass floor panels at the edges, the 200 metre long and 28 metre high bridge, the largest of its kind, is high enough for an Airbus A380 to pass underneath.

==== T1 Satellite Concourse (T1S) ====
In 2007, HKIA began the construction of a two-story T1 Satellite Concourse (T1S), previously known as the North Satellite Concourse (NSC), which opened in December 2009. This concourse was designed for narrow-body aircraft and is equipped with 10 jet bridges. The concourse has a floor area of 20,000 square metres (220,000 sq ft) and will be able to serve more than five million passengers annually. T1S was built so the airport could accommodate at least 90 percent of its passengers by aerobridges. It has two levels (one for departures and one for arrivals). A new sky bridge connecting T1 and T1S opened in November 2022, allowing passengers to walk above taxiing planes, replacing the way of taking the airport shuttle bus from the main terminal for saving time.

==== T1 Midfield Concourse ====
On 25 January 2011, Airport Authority Hong Kong (AA) unveiled phase 1 of its midfield development project which was targeted for completion by the end of 2015. The midfield area is located to the west of Terminal 1 between the two existing runways. It was the then last piece of land on the airport island available for large-scale development. This includes 20 aircraft parking stands, three of which are wide enough to serve the Airbus A380 and cater for an additional 10 million passengers annually. Passengers reach the concourse through an extension of the underground automated people mover. A joint venture of Mott MacDonald and Arup led the design of the project. Gammon Construction undertook the construction work. The Concourse began operations on 28 December 2015, and the first flight that used it was the HX658 operated by the Hong Kong Airlines flying from Hong Kong to Okinawa. On 31 March 2016, the concourse was officially inaugurated in a ceremony marking its full commissioning.

=== Former Terminal 2 ===
Former Terminal 2 with an area measuring 140,000 m^{2} (1,500,000 sq ft), together with the SkyPlaza, opened on 28 February 2007 along with the opening of the Airport station's Platform 3. It was only a low-cost carrier check-in and processing facility for departing passengers with no gates or arrival facilities (passengers were transported underground to gates at Terminal 1). The SkyPlaza was situated within. Former Terminal 2 closed on 28 November 2019 to make way for a new satellite terminal from the three-runway system.

=== New Terminal 2 ===
On 27 May 2026, the new passenger departure facilities of Terminal 2 reopened. The expansion of Terminal 2 cost around $12.9 billion. The first batch of 15 airlines relocated their passenger check-in counters from Terminal 1 to the new terminal over a two-week period. Serving as the entry/exit facility for the Third Runway concourse, it will make the new terminal a hub connecting the current airport concourse, the Third Runway concourse, the Sky Bridge (Sea-to-Air Transfer Terminal), and the Hong Kong Port of the Hong Kong-Zhuhai-Macao Bridge.

The new Terminal 2 is planning to handle eight million departing passengers within the first year of operation. In the future, arrival facilities and the Terminal 2 passenger concourse will be used in phases, with a capacity of 30 million passengers annually upon full operation, and further expansion to 50 million passengers per year.

=== Other buildings ===
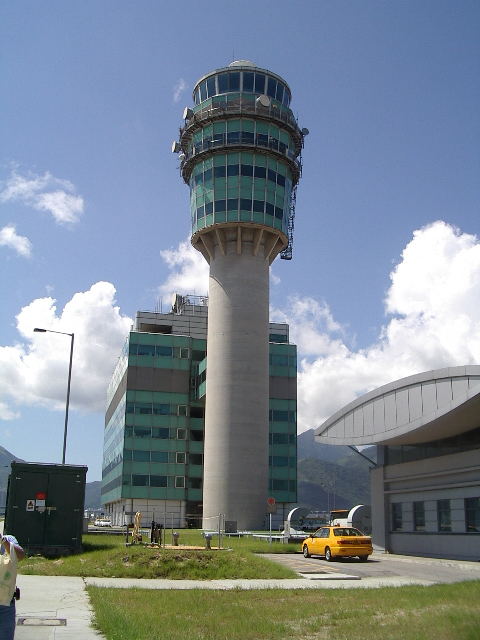
Airport control tower.

Cathay Pacific City, the head office of Cathay Pacific and Air Hong Kong, is located on the airport island. CNAC House, the office for Air China is also located in the airport complex, together with the Civil Aviation Department headquarters. HAECO also has its head office on the airport property. HK Express has its head office on the airport property, in what was previously the Dragonair House, head office of Cathay Dragon.

The Government Flying Service (GFS) has its head office building in the airport. The head office of the Air Accident Investigation Authority (AAIA) is in the Facility Building on the airport property.

== Airport expansion projects ==
In June 2010, the Airport Authority unveiled plans to develop in stages the vast midfield site of the airport island. Stage 1 will involve the construction of a new 20-gate passenger concourse to be built in two phases (completion 2015 and 2020) with 11 gates in phase 1 growing to 20 gates in phase 2. The configuration of the new concourse is similar to those at Atlanta, Bangkok–Suvarnabhumi, Berlin (Terminal 1), Chicago–O'Hare (Global Terminal), Denver, Detroit (McNamara Terminal), London–Heathrow (Terminals 2 and 5), Los Angeles (TBIT), Munich (Terminal 2), Salt Lake City, Seoul–Incheon, Washington–Dulles and Felipe Ángeles International Airport (Zumpango). After stage 1 of midfield development is completed in 2020, there will be sufficient lands remaining for further new concourses to be built as and when demand for them materialises.

=== Master Plan 2030 ===
One year after, on 2 June 2011, the Airport Authority announced and released their latest version of a 20-year blueprint for the airport's development, the Hong Kong International Airport Master Plan 2030. The study took three years and according to the authority, nine consulting organisations have been hired for the research, observation, planning and advice. The main focus is to improve the overall capacity and aircraft handling ability of the airport. Based on this, two options have been developed.

==== Option 1: Two-runway system ====
To maintain the two-runway system, there would be enhancements to the terminal and apron facilities to increase the airport's capacity. This option would enable the airport to handle a maximum of 420,000 flight movements per year, with annual passenger and cargo throughput increased to 74 million and six million tonnes respectively. The approximate cost of this plan was $23.4 billion Hong Kong dollars in 2010 prices. The Airport Authority estimated that the airport would reach its maximum runway capacity sometime around 2020 if no extra runway were to be added.

==== Option 2: Three-runway system ====
This plan focused on adding a third runway to the north of the Chek Lap Kok, the island the airport is built on, by land reclamation, using deep cement mixing, of about 650 hectares (1,600 acres). Associated facilities, additional terminals, airfield and apron facilities, would be built as well, and, combined with the new runway, it was estimated that the airport would be able to handle a maximum of 620,000 (102 per hour, or about one flight every 36 seconds)., and meet forecast annual passenger and cargo throughput of about 97 million and 8.9 million tonnes by 2030 respectively.

There were possible drawbacks. Development costs were a concern: although the proposal would increase the number of direct jobs associated with HKIA to 150,000 by 2030 and generate an ENPV of HK$912 billion (in 2009 dollars), the estimated cost was approximately HK$86.2 billion (2010). There were also environmental and local noise pollution concerns.

On 20 March 2012, the Hong Kong Government adopted this option as the official expansion plan.

The third runway, with its dedicated passenger concourse (T2 Concourse), was built parallel to the current two runways on reclaimed land directly north of the existing airport island. The third runway (referred to as the North runway) began operations in July 2022, while the original North runway (re-designated as the Centre runway) was closed for reconfiguration until 2024. Other facilities of the Three-runway system project include the T2 expansion, new T2 Concourse, automatic people mover, and baggage handling system.

== Airlines and destinations ==
=== Passenger ===
Airlines	Destinations
Aeroflot	Moscow–Sheremetyevo
Air Busan	Busan; Seasonal: Seoul–Incheon
Air Cambodia	Phnom Penh
Air Canada	Vancouver
Air China	Beijing–Capital, Beijing–Daxing, Chengdu–Shuangliu, Chengdu–Tianfu, Chongqing, Dalian, Hangzhou, Tianjin, Yinchuan
Air France	Paris–Charles de Gaulle
Air India	Delhi–Indira Gandhi
Air New Zealand	Auckland
Air Niugini	Port Moresby
Air Premia	Seoul–Incheon
AirAsia	Kota Kinabalu, Kuala Lumpur
All Nippon Airways	Tokyo–Haneda, Tokyo–Narita
Asiana Airlines	Seoul–Incheon
Bangkok Airways	Koh Samui
Batik Air Malaysia	Kuala Lumpur
British Airways	London–Heathrow
Cambodia Airways	Phnom Penh
Cathay Pacific	Almaty (begins 9 January 2027), Amsterdam, Auckland, Bangkok–Suvarnabhumi, Beijing–Capital, Bengaluru, Boston, Brisbane, Brussels, Cebu, Changsha, Chengdu–Shuangliu, Chennai, Chicago–O'Hare, Chongqing, Colombo–Bandaranaike, Dallas/Fort Worth, Delhi–Indira Gandhi, Denpasar, Dhaka, Dubai–International (resumes 31 January 2027), Frankfurt, Fukuoka, Fuzhou, Guangzhou, Haikou, Hangzhou, Hanoi, Ho Chi Minh City, Hyderabad, Jakarta–Soekarno-Hatta, Johannesburg–O. R. Tambo, Kaohsiung, Kathmandu, Kuala Lumpur, London–Heathrow, Los Angeles, Madrid, Manchester, Manila, Melbourne, Milan–Malpensa, Mumbai–Shivaji, Munich, Nagoya–Centrair, Nanjing, New York–JFK, Ningbo, Osaka–Kansai, Paris–Charles de Gaulle, Penang, Perth, Phnom Penh, Phuket, Qingdao, Riyadh (resumes 31 January 2027), San Francisco, Sapporo–Chitose, Seattle/Tacoma, Seoul–Incheon, Shanghai–Hongqiao, Shanghai–Pudong, Singapore, Surabaya, Sydney–Kingsford Smith, Taipei–Taoyuan, Tokyo–Haneda, Tokyo–Narita, Toronto–Pearson, Ürümqi, Vancouver, Wenzhou, Wuhan, Xiamen, Xi'an, Zhengzhou, Zurich; Seasonal: Adelaide, Barcelona, Christchurch, Rome–Fiumicino
Cebu Pacific	Cebu, Clark, Davao, Iloilo, Manila
China Airlines	Kaohsiung, Taipei–Taoyuan
China Eastern Airlines	Beijing–Daxing, Hangzhou, Hefei, Kunming, Lanzhou, Nanjing, Ningbo, Shanghai–Hongqiao, Shanghai–Pudong, Taiyuan, Wuhan, Xi'an
China Southern Airlines	Beijing–Daxing, Harbin, Ürümqi; Seasonal: Shenyang
Chongqing Airlines	Chongqing
Delta Air Lines	Los Angeles
Eastar Jet	Busan, Seoul–Incheon
Emirates	Bangkok–Suvarnabhumi, Dubai–International
Ethiopian Airlines	Addis Ababa
Etihad Airways	Abu Dhabi
EVA Air	Kaohsiung, Taipei–Taoyuan
Fiji Airways	Nadi
Finnair	Helsinki
Garuda Indonesia	Jakarta–Soekarno-Hatta
Greater Bay Airlines	Bangkok–Suvarnabhumi, Dunhuang, Enshi, Fukuoka, Guilin, Hohhot, Manila, Naha, Osaka–Kansai, Phu Quoc, Sendai (resumes 17 December 2026), Surabaya, Taipei–Taoyuan, Tokyo–Narita, Xuzhou, Yichang, Zhangjiajie, Zhoushan; Seasonal: Chongqing, Kuala Lumpur, Kunming, Malé, Sapporo–Chitose, Ürümqi; Charter: Datong, Koror, Tawau
Hainan Airlines	Changchun, Haikou
Hebei Airlines	Shijiazhuang
HK Express	Bangkok–Suvarnabhumi, Beijing–Daxing, Busan, Changzhou, Chiang Mai, Cheongju, Clark, Da Nang, Daegu, Fukuoka, Hanoi, Hefei (begins 3 December 2026), Hiroshima, Ishigaki, Jeju, Kaohsiung, Komatsu, Kota Kinabalu, Kuala Lumpur–Subang, Manila, Nagoya–Centrair, Naha, Nha Trang, Ningbo, Osaka–Kansai, Penang, Phu Quoc, Phuket, Sanya, Sendai, Seoul–Incheon, Taichung, Taipei–Taoyuan, Takamatsu, Tokyo–Haneda, Tokyo–Narita, Wuxi, Yiwu; Seasonal: Shimojishima
Hong Kong Airlines	Bangkok–Suvarnabhumi, Beijing–Capital, Beijing–Daxing, Chengdu–Shuangliu, Chongqing, Da Nang, Denpasar, Fukuoka, Haikou, Hailar, Hangzhou, Lijiang, Melbourne, Naha, Nanjing, Osaka–Kansai, Saipan, Sanya, Sapporo–Chitose, Seoul–Incheon, Shanghai–Hongqiao, Shanghai–Pudong, Sydney–Kingsford Smith, Taipei–Taoyuan, Tokyo–Narita, Ürümqi, Vancouver, Vientiane; Seasonal: Malé, Xi'an, Xining; Charter: Dunhuang, Koror
IndiGo	Delhi–Indira Gandhi
Japan Airlines	Tokyo–Haneda, Tokyo–Narita
Jeju Air	Seoul–Incheon
Jetstar Japan	Tokyo–Narita
Jin Air	Jeju
Juneyao Air	Shanghai–Pudong
KLM	Amsterdam
Korean Air	Seoul–Incheon
Loong Air	Hangzhou
Lufthansa	Frankfurt
Malaysia Airlines	Kuala Lumpur–International
Mandarin Airlines	Kaohsiung
MIAT Mongolian Airlines	Ulaanbaatar
Nepal Airlines	Kathmandu
Peach	Osaka–Kansai
Philippine Airlines	Manila
Qantas	Melbourne, Sydney–Kingsford Smith
Qatar Airways	Doha
Qingdao Airlines	Qingdao
Royal Brunei Airlines	Bandar Seri Begawan
Scoot	Singapore
Shandong Airlines	Jinan, Qingdao
Shanghai Airlines	Shanghai–Hongqiao, Shanghai–Pudong
Shenzhen Airlines	Chengdu–Tianfu, Nanning, Wuxi
Sichuan Airlines	Chengdu–Shuangliu
Singapore Airlines	Singapore
Spring Airlines	Shanghai–Pudong
Starlux Airlines	Taipei–Taoyuan
Sun PhuQuoc Airways	Hanoi, Phu Quoc
Swiss International Air Lines	Zurich
Thai AirAsia	Bangkok–Don Mueang
Thai Airways International	Bangkok–Suvarnabhumi
Thai Lion Air	Bangkok–Don Mueang
Tibet Airlines	Chengdu–Tianfu, Lhasa, Yuncheng
Trinity Airways	Busan, Seoul–Incheon
Turkish Airlines	Istanbul
United Airlines	Bangkok–Suvarnabhumi, Ho Chi Minh City, Los Angeles, San Francisco
Urumqi Air	Ürümqi
VietJet Air	Ho Chi Minh City, Phu Quoc
Vietnam Airlines	Hanoi, Ho Chi Minh City
XiamenAir	Fuzhou, Yinchuan

=== Cargo ===
Airlines	Destinations
AlisCargo Airlines operated by MSC Air Cargo	Milan–Malpensa
Astral Aviation	Aktobe, Brisbane, Delhi–Indira Gandhi, Dubai–Al Maktoum, Johannesburg–O. R. Tambo, Mumbai–Shivaji, Nairobi–Jomo Kenyatta, Sharjah
Atlas Air	Anchorage, Bahrain, Chicago–O'Hare, Dallas/Fort Worth, Delhi–Indira Gandhi, Hanoi, Indianapolis, Karagandy, Leipzig/Halle, Los Angeles, Milan–Malpensa, Portland (OR), Riyadh, Seoul–Incheon, Tokyo–Narita
Challenge Airlines IL	Liège, Tel Aviv
Cathay Cargo	Amsterdam, Anchorage, Astana, Atlanta, Bangkok–Suvarnabhumi, Brisbane, Chengdu–Shuangliu, Chennai, Chicago–O'Hare, Chongqing, Dallas/Fort Worth, Delhi–Indira Gandhi, Dhaka, Dubai–Al Maktoum, Frankfurt, Guadalajara, Hanoi, Houston–Intercontinental, Jakarta–Soekarno-Hatta, London–Heathrow, Los Angeles, Madrid, Melbourne, Mexico City–Felipe Ángeles, Miami, Milan–Malpensa, Mumbai–Navi, New York–JFK Osaka–Kansai, Paris–Charles de Gaulle, Penang, Phnom Penh, Portland (OR), Riyadh, San Francisco, Seoul–Incheon, Shanghai–Pudong, Singapore, Sydney–Kingsford Smith, Taipei–Taoyuan, Tokyo–Narita, Toronto–Pearson, Xiamen, Zhengzhou
CMA CGM Air Cargo	Paris–Charles de Gaulle
DHL Aviation	Amsterdam, Cincinnati, Frankfurt, Jakarta–Soekarno-Hatta, Liège, Tel Aviv
Emirates SkyCargo	Dubai–Al Maktoum
Ethiopian Airlines Cargo	Addis Ababa, Chennai, Maastricht/Aachen
EVA Air Cargo	Taipei–Taoyuan
Express Air Cargo	Bengaluru, Sharjah, Tunis
Flexport	Los Angeles
Hong Kong Air Cargo	Almaty, Athens, Bangkok–Suvarnabhumi, Birmingham, Chennai, Delhi–Indira Gandhi, Dhaka, Hanoi, Ho Chi Minh City, Osaka–Kansai, Kuala Lumpur–International, Manila, Milan–Malpensa, Nanning, Oslo, Phnom Penh, Seoul–Incheon, Shanghai–Pudong, Singapore, Sydney–Kingsford Smith, Taipei–Taoyuan, Xiamen, Zhengzhou
IAG Cargo operated by Qatar Airways Cargo	London–Stansted
Kalitta Air	Dubai–Al Maktoum, Tel Aviv
KLM Cargo	Seoul–Incheon
MSC Air Cargo	Dallas/Fort Worth
My Indo Airlines	Jakarta–Soekarno-Hatta
Nippon Cargo Airlines	Tokyo–Narita
Qantas Freight	Perth, Sydney–Kingsford Smith
Qatar Airways Cargo	Doha
Skyway Airlines	Manila
SF Airlines	Ezhou, Shenzhen, Wuhan, Xiamen
SpiceXpress	Kolkata
Tasman Cargo Airlines	Auckland, Melbourne, Sydney–Kingsford Smith
Turkish Cargo	Istanbul
UPS Airlines	Paris–Charles de Gaulle

== Statistics ==
Operations and statistics
Year	Passenger movements	Airfreight (tonnes)	Aircraft movements
1998	28,631,000	1,628,700	163,200
1999	30,394,000	1,974,300	167,400
2000	33,374,000	2,240,600	181,900
2001	33,065,000	2,074,300	196,800
2002	34,313,000	1,637,797	206,700
2003	27,433,000	2,642,100	187,500
2004	37,142,000	3,093,900	237,300
2005	40,740,000	3,402,000	263,500
2006	44,443,000	3,580,000	280,000
2007	47,783,000	3,742,000	295,580
2008	48,582,000	3,627,000	301,000
2009	45,499,604	3,440,581	273,505
2010	50,410,819	4,112,416	306,535
2011	53,909,000	3,939,000	333,760
2012	56,057,751	4,062,261	352,000
2013	59,913,000	4,122,000	372,040
2014	63,367,000	4,376,000	390,955
2015	68,488,000	4,380,000	406,000
2016	70,502,000	4,521,000	411,530
2017	72,866,000	4,937,000	421,000
2018	74,672,000	5,121,000	428,000
2019	71,500,000	4,800,000	419,730
2020	8,836,000	4,468,000	161,000
2021	1,351,000	5,025,000	145,000
2022	5,653,000	4,200,000	138,700
2023	39,500,000	4,330,000	276,100
2024	53,055,000	4,938,000	363,000
2025	60,992,000	5,070,000	394,730
Capacity
Passenger (current)			60,992,000
Passenger (ultimate)			120,000,000
Cargo (current)			5.1m tons
Cargo (ultimate)			10m tons
Passenger Stands (current)			118
Cargo Stands (current)			69
Long term and maintenance stands (current)			24
Temporary stands (current)			3
Number of destinations
air			154
water			6

== Operations ==
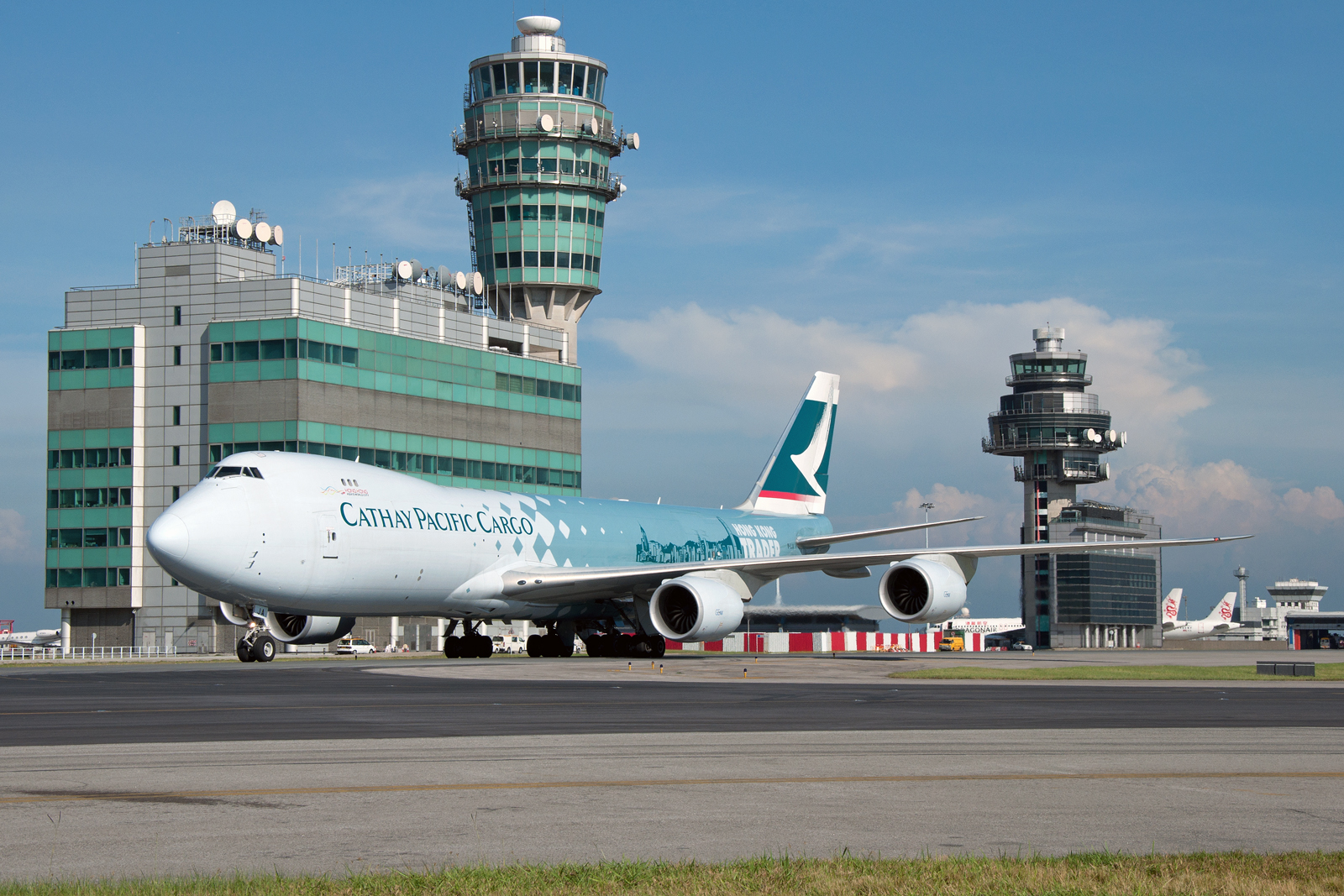
The airport control tower and a taxiing Cathay Pacific Cargo Boeing 747-8F

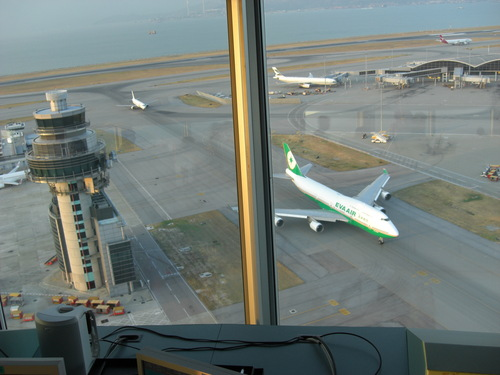
The view of the airport from the control tower, with an EVA Air Boeing 747 on a nearby taxiway

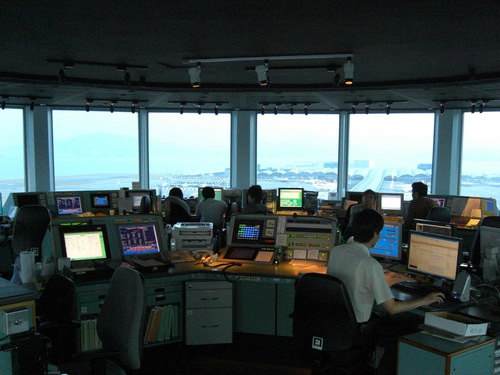
The interior of the airport control tower

The airport is operated by the Airport Authority Hong Kong, a statutory body wholly owned by the Government of Hong Kong Special Administrative Region.

The airport has three parallel runways, all of which are 3,800 metres (12,500 ft) in length and 60 metres (200 ft) wide. The south runway has a Category II Precision Approach, while the centre runway has the higher Category IIIA rating, which allows pilots to land in only 200-metre (660 ft) visibility. The two runways have a capacity of over 60 aircraft movements an hour. The airport is upgrading ATC and runways so that they can handle 68 movements per hour. Normally, the centre runway (07C/25C; until 1 December 2021 the north runway 07L/25R) is used for landing passenger planes. The south runway (07R/25L) is used for passenger planes taking off and cargo flights due to its proximity to the cargo terminal. A third runway (designated 07L/25R) to their north has opened in mid-2022, while the Centre runway has been closed for upgrades. With all three runways opened, it is estimated that the airport will be able to handle a maximum of 620,000 flights per year (102 per hour, or about one flight every 36 seconds).

As of July 2025, there are 49 frontal stands at T1 passenger concourse, 9 frontal stands at T1 satellite concourse, 19 frontal stands at T1 Midfield Concourse, bringing the total number of frontal stands at the airport to 77. Eight frontal stands are capable of accommodating the A380.

The airport was the busiest for passenger traffic in Asia in 2010, and has been the world's busiest airport for cargo traffic since 2021. In terms of international traffic, the airport is the third busiest for passenger traffic and the busiest for cargo since its operation in 1998. Over 95 international airlines are providing about 900 scheduled passenger and all-cargo flights each day between Hong Kong and some 160 destinations worldwide. About 76 percent of these flights are operated with wide-body jets. There is also an average of approximately 31 non-scheduled passenger and cargo flights each week.

The operation of scheduled air services to and from Hong Kong is facilitated by air services agreements between Hong Kong and other countries. Since the opening of HKIA, the Government of the Hong Kong Special Administrative Region has implemented a policy of progressive liberalisation of air services. Many low-cost airlines have started various regional routes to compete head-on with full-service carriers on trunk routes.

The airport's long-term expansion opportunities are subject to variables. The airport opened its third runway in July 2022 as part of a HK$141.5 billion expansion project that would increase its land footprint by 50%. On the other hand, there exists only one airway between Hong Kong and mainland China, and this single route is often and easily backed up causing delays on both sides. In addition, China requires that aircraft flying the single air route between Hong Kong and the mainland must be at an altitude of at least 15,000 feet. Talks are underway to persuade the Chinese military to relax its airspace restriction because of worsening air traffic congestion at the airport. Other than that, Hong Kong Airport Authority is cooperating with other airports in the area to relieve air traffic and in the future, Shenzhen may act as a regional airport while Hong Kong receives all the international flights.

== Air traffic ==
The Government Flying Service provides short and long-range search and rescue services, police support, medical evacuation and general-purpose flights for the Government.

=== Passenger facilities ===
Despite its size, the passenger terminal was designed for convenience. The layout and signage, moving walkways and the automated people mover help passengers move through the building. The HKIA Automated People Mover, a driverless people mover system with 3 stations transports passengers between the check-in area and the gates. The trains travel at 62 kilometres per hour (39 mph).

==== Hong Kong Business Aviation Centre ====
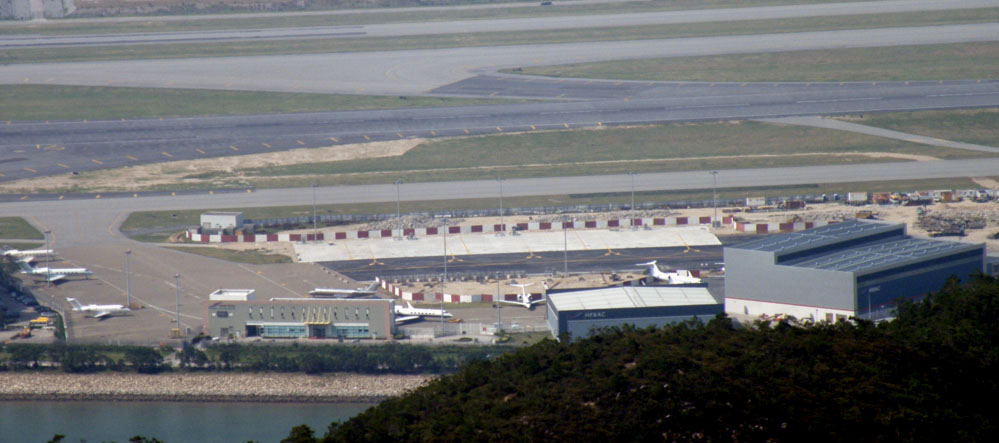
Hong Kong Business Aviation Centre

The Hong Kong Business Aviation Centre (HKBAC) is located within the airport and has its terminal and facilities separate from the public terminal. It provides services for executive aircraft and passengers, including a passenger lounge, private rooms and showers, business centre facilities, ground handling, baggage handling, fuelling, security, customs and flight planning. Designated spaces and hangars are also provided at the HKBAC for private aircraft. HKBAC has broken ground on a HK$400 million ($51 million) expansion. The project, which will double the airport's handling capacity for business jet movements, is expected to be completed in 2025.

=== Intermodal transportation hub ===
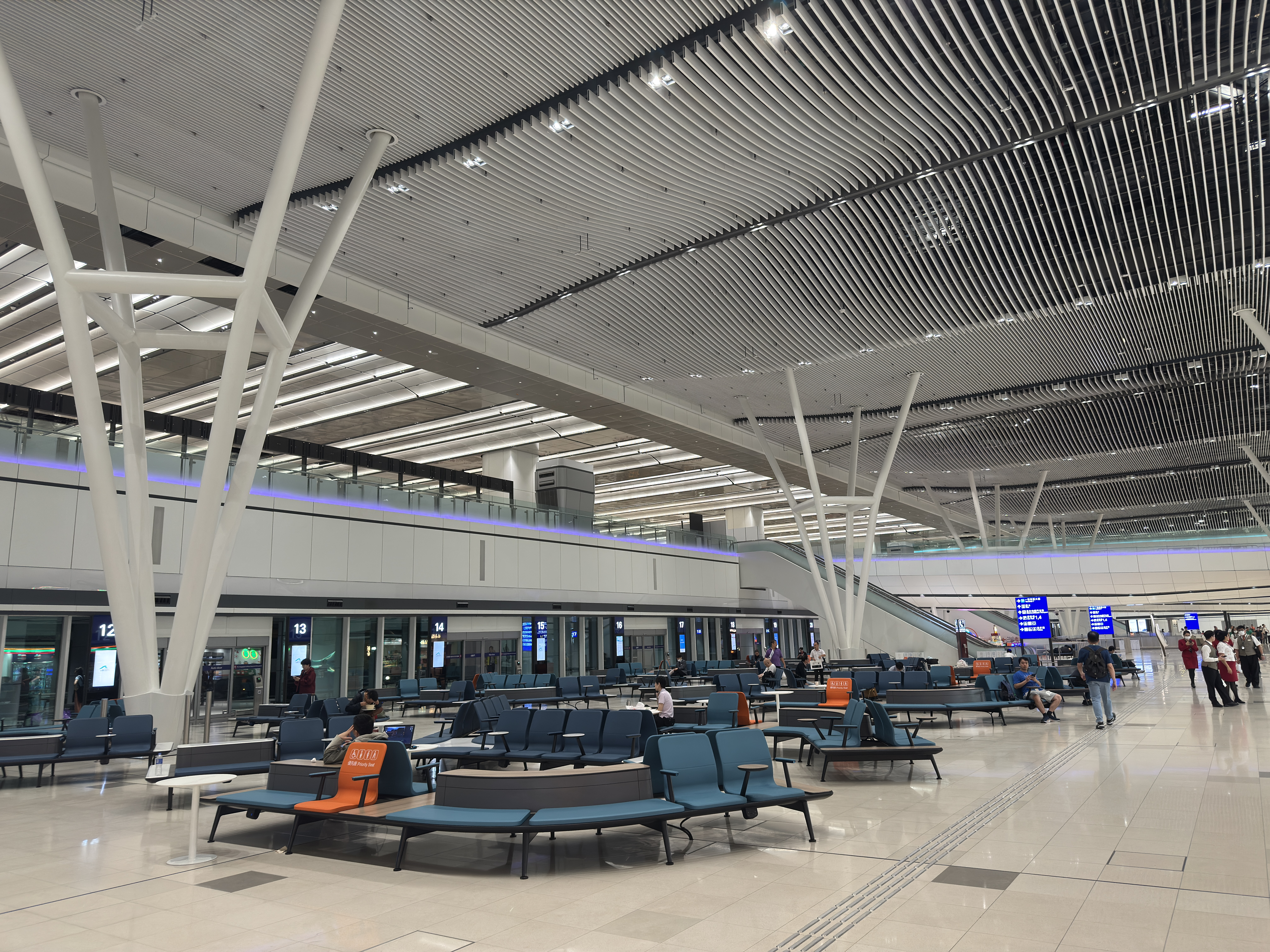
Mainland/Macao Transport and Travel Services Centre, located in Terminal 2, provides coach services to Macau and mainland China

To sustain the growth of passengers, the Airport Authority formulated a "push and pull through" strategy to expand its connections to new sources of passengers and cargo. This means adapting the network to the rapidly growing markets in China and in particular to the Pearl River Delta region (PRD). In 2003, a new Airport-Mainland Coach Station opened. The coach station has a 230-square-metre (2,500 sq ft) waiting lounge and sheltered bays for ten coaches. Many buses operate each day to transport passengers between HKIA and major cities on the Mainland.

The Coach Station was relocated to the ground floor (level 3) of Terminal 2 in 2007. The 36 bays at the new Coach Station allow cross-border coaches to make 320 trips a day carrying passengers between the airport and 90 cities and towns in the PRD. Local tour and hotel coaches also operate from T2. The coach station at T2 has shops and waiting lounges as well as a mainland coach service centre which gathers all operators together.

In late September 2003, the SkyPier high-speed ferry terminal opened. Passengers arriving at the SkyPier board buses to the terminal and arriving air passengers board ferries at the pier for their ride back to the PRD. Passengers travelling in both directions can bypass customs and immigration formalities, which reduces transit time. Four ports – Shekou, Shenzhen, Macau and Humen (Dongguan) – were initially served. As of August 2007, SkyPier serves Shenzhen's Shekou and Fuyong, Dongguan's Humen, Macau, Zhongshan and Zhuhai. Passengers travelling from Shekou and Macau can complete airline check-in procedures with participating airlines before boarding the ferries and go straight to the boarding gate for the flight at HKIA.

In 2009, the permanent SkyPier Terminal opened. The permanent ferry terminal is equipped with four berths, but the terminal is designed to accommodate eight berths. Transfer desks and baggage handling facilities are included, and the terminal is directly connected to the airport automatic people mover system.

=== Baggage and cargo facilities ===
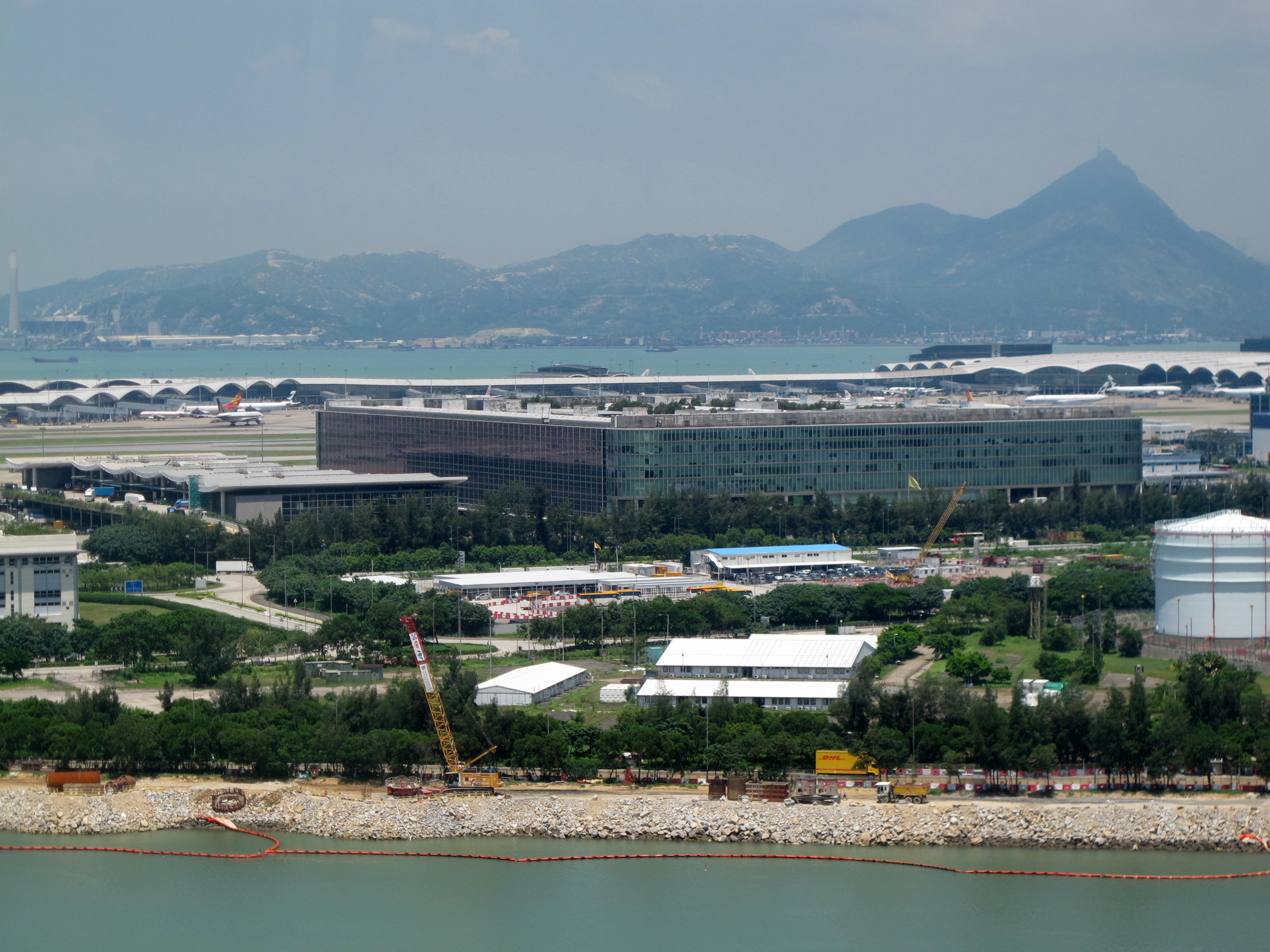
SuperTerminal 1

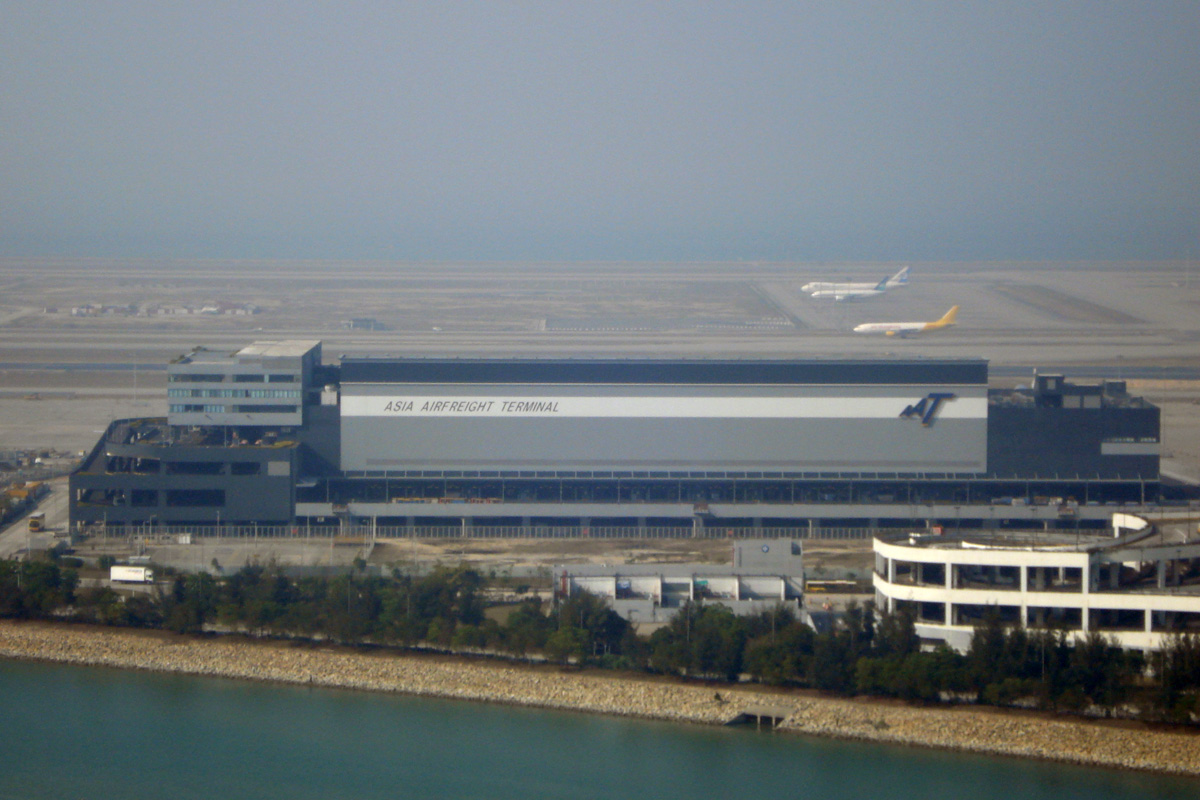
Asia Airfreight Terminal

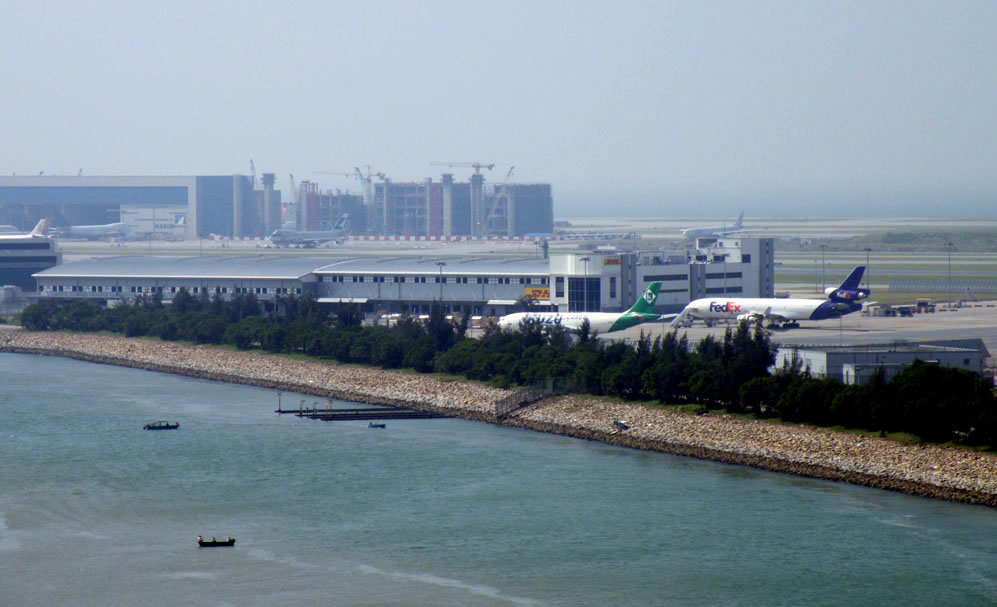
DHL Central Asia Hub

Ramp handling services are provided by Hong Kong Airport Services Limited (HAS), Jardine Air Terminal Services Limited and SATS HK Limited. Their services include the handling of mail and passenger baggage, transportation of cargo, aerobridge operations and the operation of passenger stairways. The airport has an advanced baggage handling system (BHS), the main section of which is located in the basement level of the passenger terminal, and a separate remote transfer facility at the western end of the main concourse for the handling of tight connection transfer bags.

HKIA handles over five million tonnes of cargo annually. Hong Kong Air Cargo Terminals Limited operates one of the three air cargo terminals at the airport. Its headquarters, the 328,000-square-metre (3,530,000 sq ft) SuperTerminal 1, is the world's second-largest stand-alone air cargo handling facility, after the opening of the West Cargo Handling Area of the Shanghai Pudong International Airport on 26 March 2008. The designed capacity is 2.6 million tonnes of freight a year. The second air cargo terminal is operated by Asia Airfreight Terminal Company Limited, and has a capacity of 1.5 million tonnes a year. The Cathay Cargo Terminal, which is a wholly owned subsidiary of Cathay Pacific Airways Limited, operates the third air cargo terminal since 2013, and is capable of handling an annual throughput of 2.7 million tonnes. DHL operates the DHL Central Asia Hub cargo facility which handles 35,000 parcels and 40,000 packages per hour. Hongkong Post operates the Air Mail Centre (AMC) and processes 700,000 packages per day. It is envisaged that HKIA's total air cargo capacity per annum will reach nine million tonnes ultimately.

=== Aircraft maintenance services ===
Both line and base maintenance services are undertaken by Hong Kong Aircraft Engineering Company (HAECO), while China Aircraft Services Limited (CASL) and Pan Asia Pacific Aviation Services Limited carry out line maintenance. Line maintenance services include routine servicing of aircraft performed during normal turnaround periods and regularly scheduled layover periods. Base maintenance covers all airframe maintenance services and for this HAECO has a three-bay hangar, which can accommodate up to three Boeing 747-400 aircraft and two Airbus A320 aircraft, and an adjoining support workshop. HAECO also has the world's largest mobile hangar, weighing over 400 tons. It can be used to enclose half of a wide-body aeroplane so that the whole facility can fully enclose four 747s when the mobile hangar is used.

On 29 May 2009, CASL opened its first aircraft maintenance hangar in the maintenance area of the airport. The new hangar occupies an area of about 10,000 square metres (110,000 sq ft) and can accommodate one wide-body and one narrow-body aircraft at the same time; the hangar also has an about 10,000-square-metre (110,000 sq ft) area in its annexe building. CASL specialises in Airbus A320 family and Boeing 737 Next Generation series heavy maintenance.

=== Fire and rescue services ===
Rescue and fire fighting services within the airport are covered by the Airport Fire Contingent of the Hong Kong Fire Services Department. The contingent has 282 members, operating three fire stations and two rescue berths for 24-hour emergency calls. It is equipped with 14 fire appliances which can respond to incidents within two minutes in optimum conditions of visibility and surface conditions, satisfying the relevant recommendation of the International Civil Aviation Organization. Two high-capacity rescue boats, supported by eight-speed boats, form the core of sea rescue operations. One ambulance is assigned at each of the airport fire stations.

== Ground transport ==
The airport is connected to inner Hong Kong by the Route 8 in Hong Kong North Lantau Highway on Lantau Island.

The airport is also connected to the New Territories in Hong Kong by the Tuen Mun–Chek Lap Kok Link.

There is an automated people mover, operated by the Airport Authority and maintained by MTR Corporation, connecting the East Hall to the Midfield Concourse via West Hall and Terminal 2. It was extended to SkyPier in late 2009 and extended to Midfield Concourse in 2015.

=== Bus ===
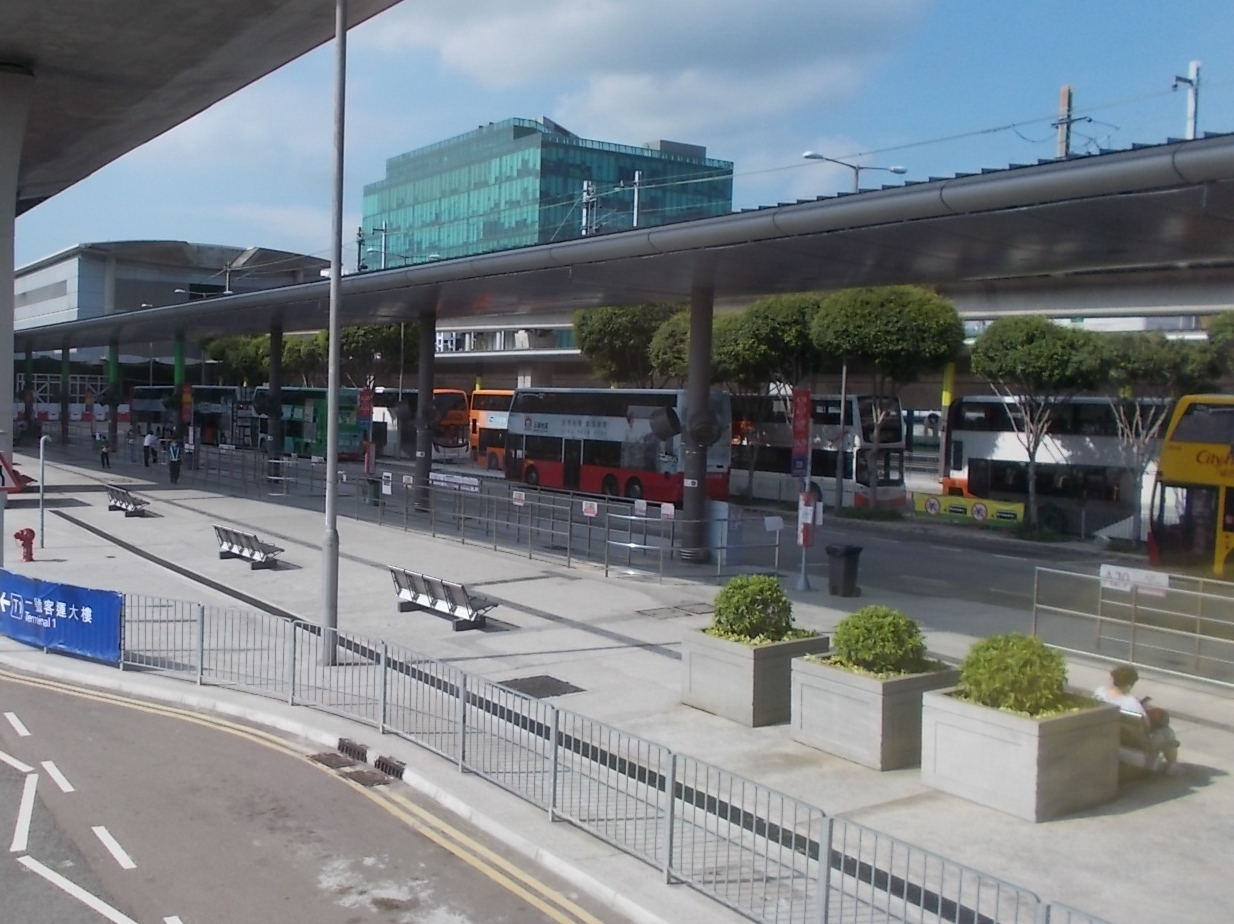
Airport Ground Transportation Centre Bus Terminus

Citybus (CityFlyer for Airport services), New Lantau Bus, Long Win Bus and Discovery Bay Transit Services (Permits required) operate more than 40 bus routes to the airport from various parts of Hong Kong, available at the Airport Ground Transportation Centre and Cheong Tat Road. The bus companies also offer more than 20 overnight "N" and "NA" Bus lines (a.k.a. Night services).

Passengers can also take bus route number S1 to the Tung Chung MTR station. From there they can board the MTR Tung Chung line which follows the same route as the MTR Airport Express Line to Central Station with cheaper fare but longer journey time.

There is a bus service to Hong Kong–Zhuhai–Macau Bridge Control Point, with services between Chek Lap Kok, Hong Kong to Zhuhai and Macau. Coach services are also available to major cities and towns in Guangdong province. such as Dongguan, Guangzhou and Shenzhen. And Also for HZMBus to Macau

=== Ferry ===
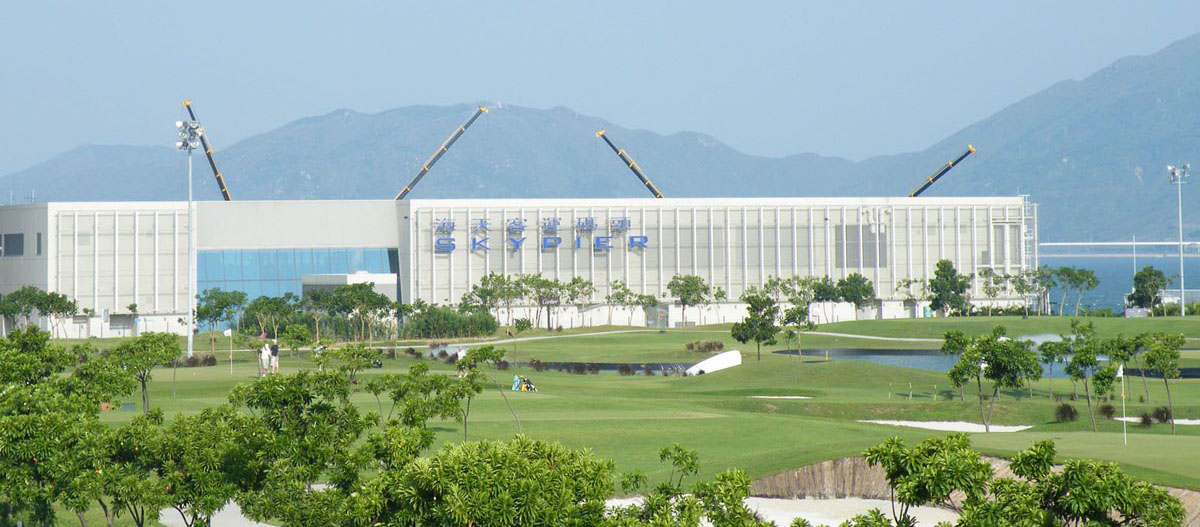
Skypier

Direct ferry services are available from the airport to various destinations throughout the Pearl River Delta (including Macau) via Skypier. Passengers using these services are treated as transit passengers and are not considered to have entered Hong Kong for immigration purposes. For this reason, access to the ferry terminal is before immigration at the airport for arriving passengers. Check-in services are available at these piers. Four ports – Shekou, Shenzhen Airport (Fuyong) and Humen (Dongguan) in mainland China, and Outer Harbour Ferry Terminal in Macau– were initially served, extending to Guangzhou and Zhongshan at the end of 2003. The Zhuhai service began on 10 July 2007 while a Nansha service started on 14 July 2009.

Cross-boundary ferry services were suspended during the COVID-19 pandemic; the sea-to-air transfer service from Shenzhen Shekou resumed in October 2020, and ferry service to and from Macau resumed on 30 December 2022. As of October 2026, the SkyPier network covers nine ports – Dongguan Humen, Guangzhou Nansha, Guangzhou Pazhou, the Macau Maritime Ferry Terminal, Macau (Taipa), Shenzhen Fuyong, Shenzhen Shekou, Zhongshan and Zhuhai – although services to Macau (Taipa) and Zhuhai were temporarily unavailable.

=== Rail ===
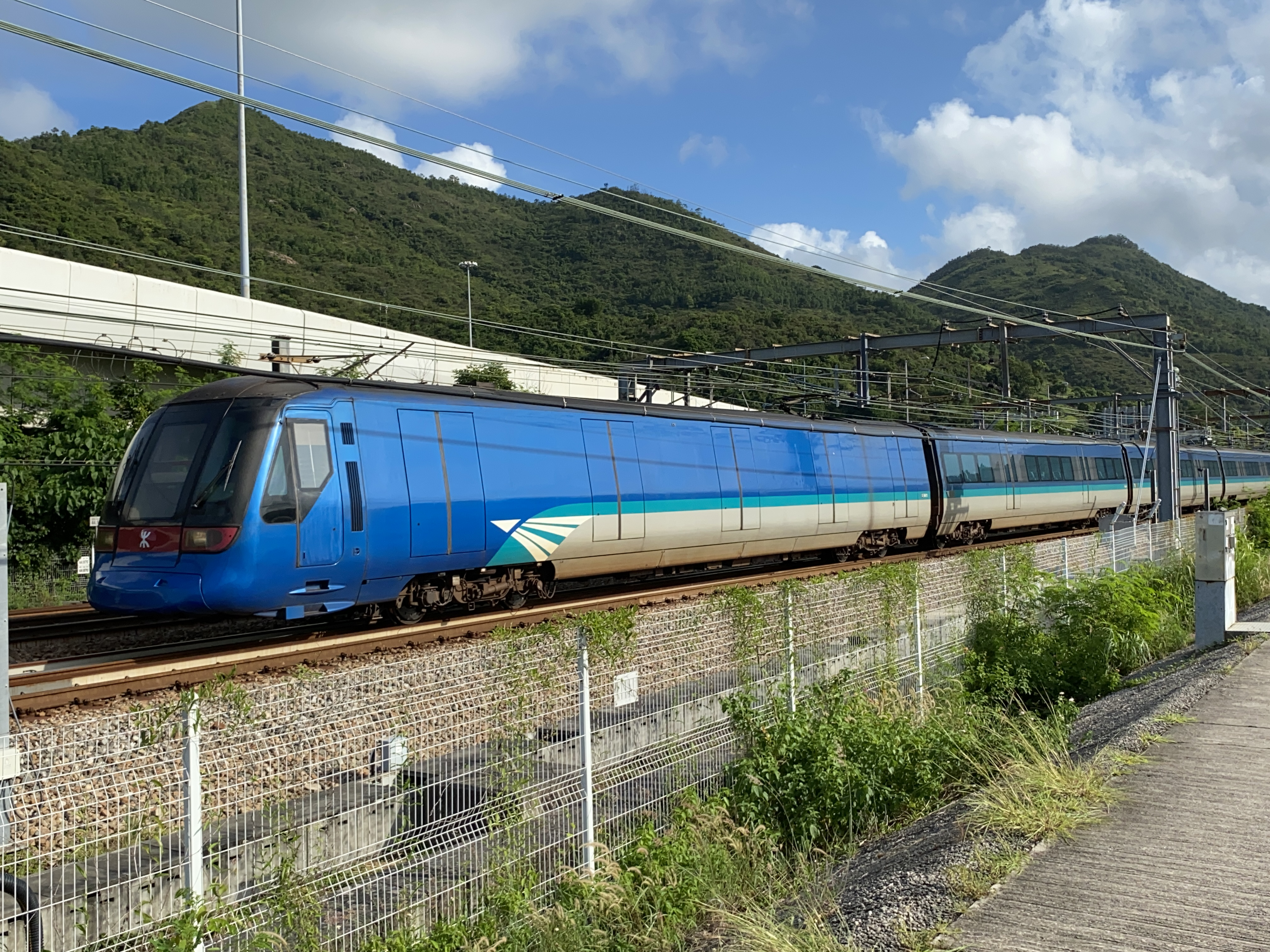
Airport Express connects the airport and the central business district of Central

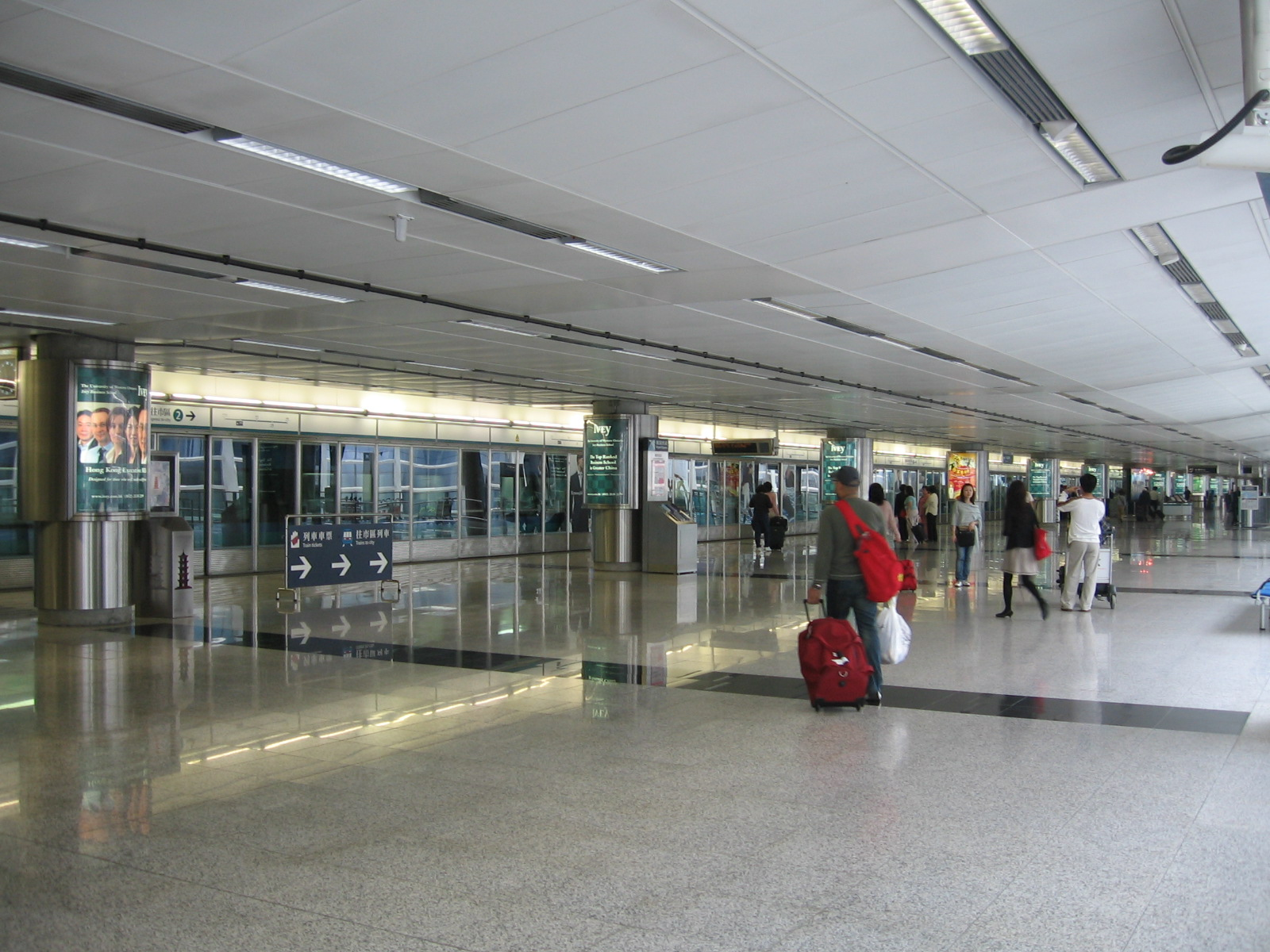
Airport Express – Airport station

The fastest service from the city to the airport is the Airport Express, which is a part of the Hong Kong rail network, and a dedicated airport rail link as part of the MTR rapid transit network. The line serves between Asia-World-Expo and Hong Kong (Central) Station makes intermediate stops at the following stations:

1. The Airport Express line originally terminated at Airport station, where trains open doors on both sides, allowing direct access to either Terminal 1 or Terminal 2. It was later extended to AsiaWorld–Expo station on 20 December 2005 to facilitate the opening of the nearby AsiaWorld–Expo venue. During events at the venue, some Tung Chung line trains, which largely share the same tracks as the Airport Express, serve this station instead of Tung Chung, but these trains do not stop by the Airport station.
2. Tsing Yi Station (located in the northeastern part of Tsing Yi Island, Kwai Tsing District, Tsing Yi.)
3. Kowloon Station (located in the Yau Tsim Mong District on the western part of the Kowloon Peninsula, this station is the major transfer hub in the Kowloon Peninsula. Connections are also available for taxis, MTR Shuttle Buses and public/private buses at Elements. In-town check-in services is available for Cathay Pacific, Hong Kong Airlines and Qantas.)
4. Hong Kong Station, the terminus, is located at the northern coast of Central and Western District on Hong Kong Island. It takes approximately 24 minutes to reach the airport from Hong Kong Station. Hong Kong Station also provides in-town check-in services for 6 airlines.

=== Taxi ===
The airport is served by three types of taxis, distinguished by colours:

- Urban Taxis connect the Airport with Hong Kong Island, Kowloon Peninsula and parts of the new towns of Metropolitan Hong Kong such as Tsuen Wan, Sha Tin and Tseung Kwan O.(urban taxis can go anywhere in Hong Kong except southern parts of Lantau Island).
- New Territories Taxis connect the airport with the New Territories, except those parts in the Metropolitan Hong Kong Area such as Tsuen Wan, Sha Tin and Tseung Kwan O (except parts of Hang Hau) were served by urban taxis.
- Lantau Taxis connect the airport with the rest of Lantau Island.

=== Parking ===
Hong Kong International Airport has several passenger and commercial parking facilities, including Car Park 1, Car Park 3 (Generation 3), Car Park 4 and Car Park 5 (Generation 2), as well as parking facilities for taxis and light goods vehicles. Automated parking facilities, including Park & Fly and Park & Visit, are also available at the Hong Kong Port of the Hong Kong–Zhuhai–Macao Bridge for passengers travelling to or from the airport.

The Park & Fly automated parking facility at Hong Kong International Airport

== Accidents and incidents ==
The following are aviation accidents or incidents at the current HKIA (see accidents and incidents at the former HKIA at Kai Tak):

- On 22 August 1999, China Airlines Flight 642 (an MD-11 operated by subsidiary Mandarin Airlines), which was landing at Hong Kong International Airport during Typhoon Sam after a flight from Bangkok International Airport (now Bangkok Don Mueang International Airport), rolled over and caught fire, coming to rest upside down beside the runway. Of the 315 passengers and crew on board, 3 people were killed and 219 were injured.
- On 20 October 2025, Emirates SkyCargo Flight 9788, a Boeing 747-400BDSF operated by Turkish carrier Air ACT, crash landed on Runway 07L. The aircraft touched down, then turned away from the runway, crashed through the fencing and collided with an airport patrol vehicle that was travelling on a service road outside of the runway's fencing. The patrol car got pushed by the aircraft into the sea and plunged into the water. All four crew members onboard survived, however the two people in the patrol vehicle struck by the plane died.

== Accolades ==
Year	Award	Category	Results	Ref
2008	Airport Service Quality Awards by Airports Council International	Best Airport Worldwide	3rd	
2009	Airport Service Quality Awards by Airports Council International	Best Airport Worldwide	3rd	
2009	Airport Service Quality Awards by Airports Council International	Best Airport in Asia-Pacific	3rd	
2009	Airport Service Quality Awards by Airports Council International	Best Airport by Size (over 40 million passenger)	Won	
2010	Airport Service Quality Awards by Airports Council International	Best Airport Worldwide	3rd	
2011	Airport Service Quality Awards by Airports Council International	Best Airport Worldwide	4th	
2017	World Airport Awards by Skytrax	World's Best Airport for Dining	1st	

== See also ==
- Airport Freight Forwarding Centre
- Airport Security Unit
- Hong Kong–Zhuhai–Macau Bridge
- List of airports with triple takeoff/landing capability
- List of busiest airports by cargo traffic
- List of busiest airports by passenger traffic
- List of places in Hong Kong
- Megaprojects and Risk
- Shek Kong Airfield – a military airbase in Hong Kong
- Transport in Hong Kong
- Tuen Mun–Chek Lap Kok Link
