= Hactl =

Hong Kong Air Cargo Terminals Limited 香港空運貨站有限公司
- Company type: Privately owned company
- Industry: Air transportation
- Founded: 1971; 55 years ago
- Headquarters: Hong Kong
- Area served: Hong Kong
- Key people: Chief Executive: Mr Wilson Kwong
- Parent: Jardine Pacific; Wharf Holdings; CK Hutchison Holdings; China National Aviation Holding
- Website: www.hactl.com

Hong Kong Air Cargo Terminals Limited (Chinese: 香港空運貨站有限公司), commonly known as Hactl, is one of the leading air cargo terminal operators in the world. Located at Hong Kong International Airport, it handled a total throughput of 1.65 million tonnes of cargo in 2018.

== History ==
Hong Kong Air Cargo Terminals Limited (Hactl) was founded in 1971 in Hong Kong. It started its air cargo logistics operations at the Kai Tak International Airport, Kowloon Peninsula in 1976 and it was the only air cargo terminal operator in town at that time. On 6 July 1998, it was relocated to SuperTerminal 1 (ST1) at Hong Kong International Airport, Chek Lap Kok, Lantau Island, Hong Kong.

== Shareholders ==
Hactl is jointly owned by the following shareholders.

- Jardine Pacific: 41.67%
- Wharf Holdings: 20.83%
- CK Hutchison Holdings: 20.83%
- China National Aviation Holding: 16.67%

== See also ==
- SuperTerminal 1
