= Hong Kong International Airport Master Plan 2030 =

Expansion project of Hong Kong international airport

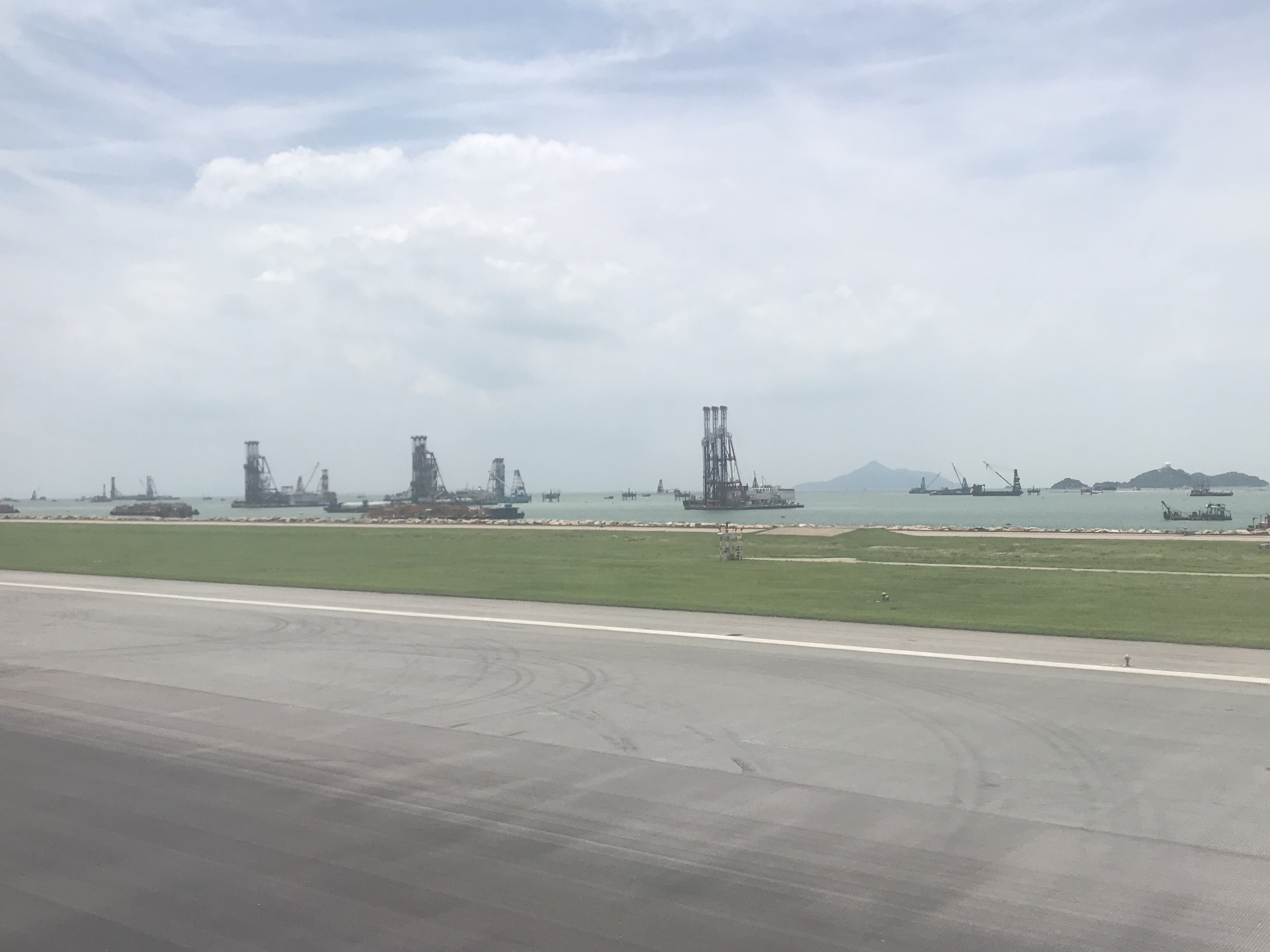
Hong Kong International Airport third runway construction in 2018

Hong Kong International Airport ("HKIA") is connected to about 180 destinations, through over 1,000 daily flights by more than 100 airlines. Hong Kong is 5 hours away from half the world's population, so in order to meet future demand until 2030 and beyond, the Airport Authority Hong Kong ("AAHK") proposed the expansion of HKIA into a three-runway system ("3RS") to support the two currently operated runways, through the introduction of Master Plan 2030 ("MP 2030") in 2011. Facing a projected increase in air traffic, the Airport Authority Hong Kong promulgated the Hong Kong International Airport Master Plan 2030 on 2 June 2011. Its main project aimed at expanding the current airport infrastructure to a Third-Runway System to maintain the position of Hong Kong International Airport as a leading international and regional aviation hub.

== Project overview ==
T2 expansion is currently (2024) under construction in the Expansion Area

The three-runway project involves seven core projects, namely:

1. Construction of the Third Runway: The new runway (now in operation as the North Runway) will be 3,800 metres (12,500 ft) long and 60 metres (200 ft) wide, with its supporting taxiway systems, which is set to be parallel to and north of the existing two runways. The third runway is expected to enlarge the maximum capacity of Air Traffic Movements ("ATMs") by 33 movements per hour or more.
2. Land Reclamation: Approximately 650 hectares (1,600 acres) of land to the north of the existing airport island will be acquired through land formation, about 40% on top of disused contaminated mud pits using deep cement mixing.
3. Construction of new passenger concourse and parking positions: A new passenger concourse with more than 280,000 square metres (3,000,000 sq ft) of floor area, with over 100 parking stands including 62 frontal and 43 remote stands and an apron will be built to support the new runway.
4. Expansion of the existing Terminal 2 building: The expanded Terminal 2 and new concourse are targeted to serve an addition of 30 million passengers annually, providing arrivals, departures and full-fledged passenger services.
5. Provision of a new Automated People Mover system: A 2,600-metre-long (2,800-yard) new APM system with an integrated maintenance depot will be extended to connect Terminal 2 with the new passenger concourse. Operating at its top speed of 80 kilometres per hour (50 mph) per hour, the new system can transport up to 10,800 passengers per hour.
6. Provision of a new Baggage Handling System: The new high-speed baggage system, which links Terminal 2 with the new passenger concourse, aims to transport the first baggage to the luggage belt upon 20 minutes of passengers' arrival and the last baggage within 40 minutes. It can transport bags at a rate up to 3 times faster than the system used today.
7. Construction of comprehensive road network and transportation facilities: A multi-modal transport facility will be built to provide additional coach parking, taxis and limousines staging areas, pre-booked taxis pick-up area, for connecting services between Hong Kong/Mainland and HKIA.

== Timeline and project development ==
The development of the 3RS include different stages of planning, approval and implementation. Research was done by AAHK from 2008 to 2010, where the MP 2030 was compiled and eventually published by the AAHK in June 2011. The MP 2030 outlined the two-runway system and 3RS as options for future development, compared the two in terms of air connectivity, economic benefits, construction cost, funding and environmental issues, and concluded that only 3RS can fully meet Hong Kong's long-term needs.

A three-month public consultation exercise was then conducted, with the findings compiled by the University of Hong Kong's Social Sciences Research Centre being announced in December 2011. In short, the majority of the respondents see highly of the HKIA. 73% of the respondents preferred expanding into a 3RS, and 83% agreed that HKIA should continue to be expanded to cope with the future air traffic demand. However, less than half of the respondents preferred 3RS after considering the environmental impact and construction cost in isolation. This consultation was condemned by Friends of the Earth and Airport Development Concern Network as being unfair and "fake" respectively.

In March 2012, the Executive Council ("ExCo"), in-principle and for planning purposes, approved the AAHK to adopt the 3RS as the future development direction for HKIA. Subsequently, the AAHK commenced the Environmental Impact Assessment ("EIA") studies which analysed the potential environmental impact of the project across 12 aspects such as noise and fisheries.

An exhibition and public forums were held in 2013, and the EIA report was submitted to the Environmental Protection Department for consideration in April 2014. The report was then available for a one-month public inspection, and was subsequently approved with the Environmental Permit granted by the Director of Environmental Protection on 7 November 2014. This was highly criticised by environmental groups such as Friends of the Earth for neglecting public and expert opinions.

The ExCo further endorsed the expansion of the HKIA into a 3RS on 17 March 2015. The project is expected to cost HK$141.5 billion, with funding coming from bank loans, bonds issuance, HKIA's operational surplus and end-users. An Airport Construction Fee of HK$180 per departing passenger was proposed, but the AAHK subsequently lowered it, with 70% of departing passengers paying HK$90 or less as announced in September 2015. The funding principle of "Joint Contribution and User-pay" remained unchanged.

The endorsement of the ExCo sparked public outrage, as it left a lot of questions such as the use of airspace unanswered, and this funding structure was said to have effectively bypassed the Legislative Council ("LegCo") because Government guarantee, allocation of funds and passing of resolution by the LegCo were not required. Members of Panel on Economic Development raised similar concerns, in which the Administration responded by saying that the AAHK was granted power under the Airport Authority Ordinance to make necessary financial arrangements for airport expansion and operation. A "Subcommittee to Follow Up Issues Relating to the 3RS at the HKIA" was endorsed on 15 May 2015 upon the request of the Panel on Economic Development of LegCo.

The draft Chek Lap Kok Outline Zoning Plan was approved and the reclamation was authorised by the Chief Executive-in-Council on 26 April 2016. This was once again disapproved by Green Sense for ignoring the ecological, noise and airspace problems. The construction of the 3RS and the collection of the Airport Construction Fee started on 1 August 2016, and was expected to complete by 2023.

The third runway, known as the North Runway, was opened in July 2022. The third runway is 650 hectares in land area, roughly the size of Gibraltar. The Centre Runway and Terminal 2 of the airport were then closed to facilitate construction works, expansion and upgrades. The Center Runway was reopened on the 28th of November 2024. The T2 expansion is currently (2024) under construction.

== Interaction between government and different stakeholders ==
=== Between AAHK and government and the public ===
AAHK has been taking a leading role in introducing the 3RS Project, with great emphasis on the urgency of the current problem regarding insufficiency of the existing 2RS in meeting rising future air traffic demand. It is claimed that, by 2016 or 2017, the existing 2RS will reach its maximum practical capacity of 68 ATMs per hour, or 420,000 ATMs per year. In face of the fierce competition from neighbouring airports who have been actively planning for their expansion projects, AAHK expected that the 3RS will be able to handle over 100 million passengers, nearly 9 million tonnes of cargo and 607,000 ATMs which would enable Hong Kong to maintain the competitive advantage as an aviation hub in attracting foreign businesses. It is estimated that by 2030 the 3RS would have generated HK $167 million, and will further bring economic benefits of $455 billion over 50 years.

The proposal has attracted widespread public opposition, and has aroused great concern on whether the infrastructure project which involved the highest cost since 1997 is justified by its alleged urgency and effectiveness. Nevertheless, despite public challenge over the enormous economic benefits as claimed, the government has attached great importance to the 3RS project and has largely agreed that there are strong justifications and urgency to proceed with the implementation. The Secretary for Transport and Housing Bureau Anthony Cheung has also publicly expressed the government view that such a project would be endorsed and recognized its potential economic contribution to Hong Kong's GDP.

=== Between government and green groups on environmental issues ===
The construction of 3RS requires reclamation which will in turn cause solid, water, noise and air pollution; obstruct the travelling corridor of Chinese White Dolphins ("CWD") given the reclaimed area is situated in the heart of the CWD hotspots; and affect CWD or other marine animal's habitat.

Although the EIA report recommended a lot of mitigation measures in light of different environmental concerns, different environmental protection groups such as Friends of the Earth, The Hong Kong Dolphin Conservation Society ("HKDCS"), the Conservancy Association and WWF Hong Kong still questioned the effectiveness of alleviating measures proposed and urged the Advisory Council on the Environment ("ACE") to reject the EIA report on the grounds that insufficient mitigation measures were adopted and figures used for Air Quality Assessment were flawed. In particular, the HKDCS held the "30 Third Runway Victims" Campaign hoping to use public pressure to ensure the ACE examine the EIA report with CWD's interest in mind.

In view of this, the ACE has raised questions and requested extra information and detailed statistics from the AAHK. For instance, asking AAHK to clarify how the establishment of a New Marine Park in 2023 can be used to mitigate the construction phase impacts from 2016- 2022, explain how can AAHK ensure the effectiveness of the New Marine Park etc. The AAHK submitted further information and made responses correspondingly.

Originally, the ACE members expressed concerns and stated that they were inclined not to endorse the EIA report. However, upon the new "Marine Ecology and Fisheries Enhancement Plans" proposed by AAHK and the decision of the Agriculture, Fisheries and Conservation Department ("AFCD") to establish the Southwest Lantau Marine Park and Soko islands Marine Park, the ACE members ultimately gave a green light and endorsed the EIA report by requesting the government to consider imposing conditions before granting the environmental permit to AAHK.

=== Between government and concern groups on airspace issues ===
The People's Aviation Watch ("PAW") claimed that the proposed third runway would only reach a quarter of its potential due to airspace conflict with the Shenzhen Bao'an International Airport (SZIA). Aircraft landing from and departing towards the west or those landing from the east but fails to land would have to enter the airspace of SZIA and interfere with their final approach of landing and departing. Since the allocation of airspace is on a first-come-first-served basis, if consensus could not be reached with SZIA, 3RS could only function for flights departing towards the east.

The government replied that a Tripartite Working Group ("TWG") was jointly established by the Civil Aviation Administration of China, the Civil Aviation Department of Hong Kong and the Civil Aviation Authority of Macau SAR in 2004 to manage the air traffic in the regions of Pearl River Delta. "Pearl River Delta Region Air Traffic management Planning and Implementation Plan (Version 2.0)" was formulated in 2007 which considered the operational need for 3RS. The Mainland Government also showed support towards 3RS by issuing guiding opinion on 2016.

Kevin Choi, the deputy director of civil aviation, told lawmakers during a legislative council subcommittee meeting that the delegation of airspace was still unclear. Therefore, many people consider that 3RS should not be built without any guarantee from the Mainland to open up its airspace.

=== Between government and the citizens on judicial review ("JR") issues ===
There have been instances where JR have been lodged by citizens to challenge different aspects of the 3RS.

For example, ExCo's affirmation of the 3RS in March 2014 was challenged by Wong Chun-yeung (writ filed in June 2015), and the issuance of the environmental permit by the Environmental Protection Department to AAHK was also challenged by Ho Loy, supported by the Dolphin Conservation Society and People's Aviation Watch, and Tam Kai-hei. A four-day judicial battle was subsequently conducted in July 2016, in which airspace issues and habitat loss to Chinese white dolphins were raised as issues unresolved in the EIA. Green Sense chief executive Roy Tam said that the authority had "disrespected" the JR by commencing work before a judgement was made. An AAHK spokesman said the court was clear that they were legally entitled to charge passengers for the 3RS. However, further comments were refused as the case had entered judicial proceedings.

Hui Sin-hang, Raphael Wong and Koo Sze-yiu have also tried challenging AAHK's power to charge passengers to build the third runway. However, the application was rejected on 15 March 2016, where the judge ruled that AAHK has the statutory power to implement policies that aim to improve the services and develop HKIA, including implementing the necessary fees. It was also said that Hong Kong government will remain control over the concerned airspace.

== Environmental impact assessment report ==
The Airport Authority released the Environmental Impact Assessment Report in June 2014. It evaluated the need of the Third-Runway Project and the possible alternatives. It then proposed about 250 mitigation measures upon the measurement of potential environmental impacts across 12 key aspects. They include air quality impact, hazard to human life, noise impact, water quality impact, sewage and sewage treatment implications, land contamination, terrestrial ecological impact, marine ecological impact, fisheries impact, landscape and visual impact, cultural impact and health impact.

On 7 November 2014, the Director of Environmental Protection approved the report and granted an Environmental Permit to commence the Third-Runway Project.

=== Responses to measurements ===
==== Legislative council ====
The Panel on Environmental Affairs thought that the Environmental Impact Assessment Report failed to cover the cumulative environmental impacts of the Project. To fill the loopholes, they called for a "Strategic Environmental Assessment", a macro-level assessment. The procedures and criteria, which includes screening, scoping, environmental assessment and reporting, consultation and monitoring, should follow that of Singapore and Scotland.

==== Civil society ====
===== Political parties =====
The Democratic Alliance for the Betterment and Progress of Hong Kong supported the Third- Runway Project but did not comment on the Environmental Impact Assessment Report.

The Democratic Party showed varying opinions. Sin Chung-kai and Ho Chun-yan supported the Third-Runway Project, but did not comment on the Environmental Impact Assessment Report. Chai Man-hon, who initiated a petition against the Third-Runway Project within the party, criticized the Environmental Impact Assessment Report as failing to "fully address" the environmental and ecological problems.

The Civic Party, resonated by green groups, questioned the adopted criteria and measurement. For noise impact, they deemed the Airport Authority's threshold for measuring acceptable obsolete and could not reflect the adverse effects accurately. For air quality impact, they showed reservation for the calculation methods, particularly the predicted 83% reduction in nitrogen oxides from 2013 to 2031. They found it "overly optimistic", especially when there was strong contrary evidence that the level of nitrogen oxides had been rapidly increasing.

===== Academia =====
Researches investigated impacts of the Third-Runway Project on the livelihood of Chinese white dolphins. They pointed out that the Environmental Impact Assessment Report did not include the volume of slow-moving vessels, marine traffic and potential impacts of temporary work in the assessment, which might affect the dolphins significantly. They also criticised that the measurement assumed, without scientific support, that the dolphins would shift part of their home range into Chinese waters during construction.

===== Other concern groups =====
The Ecology Alumni of the University of Hong Kong expressed concerns towards the criteria adopted in the Environmental Impact Assessment Report. When measuring marine ecological impacts, the observation points chosen in the water quality modelling were "limited" and "unfit" to measure the effects of degraded water quality on corals. Moreover, many rare corals, such as Guaiagorgia, were left out. Therefore, the report's conclusion that land formation works had "low to moderate" ecological impact on the corals was premature.

Furthermore, they disagreed with the report's estimation on fisheries impact. Firstly, the fish survey methodology, relying solely on qualitative records, was "inappropriate" and "inconclusive". Secondly, there were no night survey for pelagic fish, underestimating biodiversity in the area. Thirdly, there were no fish surveys during winter, missing out winter spawners. The Airport Authority's justification that the project site was an "unimportant spawning and nursery grounds" was invalid.

==== Private sector ====
===== Industrial sector =====
The industrial sector, such as the Federation of Hong Kong Industries, agreed with the criteria in measuring the environmental impact of the Third-Runway Project. They thought that the Environmental Impact Assessment Report had sufficiently addressed the environmental problems and adequately fulfilled the requirements of the environmental protection laws. Weighing the economic benefits against environmental impacts, the Project should be implemented as it could boost Hong Kong's competitiveness and maintain its status as the Asian air transport hub.

===== Business sector =====
The business sector, such as the Hong Kong Chinese Importers' and Exporters' Association, acknowledged the urgent need for a third runway because it would contribute significantly to the GDP, maintain Hong Kong's competitiveness as the air transport hub of Asia, and attract foreign investment. However, they disagreed with the method of measurement. In deciding whether damage to the environment was justified, the "better" measurement would be calculating the economic payoff in "GDP per kWh used".

=== Responses to mitigation measures ===
==== Government ====
===== Airport Authority Hong Kong =====
The Environmental Impact Assessment Report concluded that with the mitigation measures, the construction and operation phases shall pose acceptable impact on the key environmental aspects. An Environmental Monitoring and Audit Manual was issued to ensure compliance with the Report and assess the effectiveness of the proposed mitigation measures. Monitoring reports were scheduled to be released periodically, followed by a final review report to assess the need for further mitigation measures or remedial action.

===== Advisory Council on the Environment =====
Advisory Council on the Environment under the Environmental Protection Department expressed concern regarding the regional marine and terrestrial ecology. It suggested to construct a marine park and implement the Marine Ecology and the Fisheries Management Plan.

==== Legislative council ====
Members of the Panel on Economic Development questioned whether aircraft noises would shift northwards due to flight paths. They thought that noise mitigation measures should not only focus on the originally contemplated areas such as Ma Wan. Compensatory measures should also be offered to neighbouring communities directly affected by the construction and increased flight traffic. Moreover, they requested the government to produce supplementary information regarding its response towards public concern. For instance, they asked the government to propose measures to address concerns raised by green groups, justify the omissions of some concerns and develop an online platform to allow instant public feedback.

==== Civil society ====
===== Political parties =====
The Civic Party raised doubts about putting the South Runway on standby mode at night to alleviate aircraft noise as a mitigation measure. Firstly, there might be underutilization if it was closed at night, failing to reach the forecast maximum capacity of 102 flights per hour. Secondly, such measure, together with the installation of noise enclosures in nearly populated areas and restriction on the use of comprehensive development area, strongly indicated that the expansion of the airport into a three-runway system would unjustifiably pose an onerous burden on the environment.

Furthermore, the Civic Party criticised that the remedy by constructing a marine park, which was to be completed by 2023, might not be promptly delivered to restore the marine habitat for Chinese white dolphins.

===== Green groups =====
On a joint press conference in September 2014, Friends of the Earth, the Hong Kong Dolphin Conservation Society, the Conservancy Association and WWF-Hong Kong doubt the effectiveness of the proposed mitigation measures regarding the Chinese white dolphins. To optimize conservation, they recommended the expansion of the marine park to endorse the entire core habitat in West Lantau.

They were also dissatisfied with the Marine Ecology and the Fisheries Management Plan. The measures to compensate for the loss of marine habitats due to the reclamation were allegedly inadequate. Claiming that the applicability of deploying artificial reefs and other improvement work in marine ecology had not been scientifically proven in Hong Kong, they urged Advisory Council on Environment to reject the Environmental Impact Assessment Report.

Meanwhile, Green Sense contended that many measures in the Report were deployed in other construction projects such as the Hong Kong-Zhuhai-Macau Bridge. However, it denounced the principle of "destroy first, remedy second" as upheld in those measures which overlooked the importance of conserving the marine environment. It also challenged their effectiveness, particularly regarding the declining number of Chinese white dolphins. Considering previous records, it worried that the government would revoke its promise of building a marine park.

===== Public =====
According to a report by the Social Sciences Research Centre of the University of Hong Kong in December 2011, the respondents broadly supported a series of mitigation measures to tackle issues regarding noise, air quality, conservation of dolphins and reclamation.

===== Private sector =====
Federation of Hong Kong Industries had confidence in the proposed mitigation measures. With close public monitoring, practices such as using the non-dredge method for reclamation would be sufficient to reduce negative effects on the environment.

== Public consultation exercise ==
From 3 June to 2 September 2013, the Airport Authority conducted a public consultation exercise to solicit public support on the Third-Runway Project. Two development options were provided: to maintain the present two-runway system by enhancing the existing airport facilities to increase overall handling capacity; and to further develop into a third-runway system. While both options bear significant financial implications, latter costs more, but delivers 1.5 times less air traffic movements, possibly more sustainable in meeting the city's air traffic demand beyond 2030.

A team led by Professor John Bacon-Shone under Social Sciences Research Centre of the University of Hong Kong was commissioned as a third-party institution to collect, analyse and report views of different stakeholders. Further, another public consultation exercise was conducted from 20 June to 19 July 2014 for public inspection of the Environmental Impact Assessment Report regarding the adoption and the implementation of the Master Plan 2030.

=== Promotion of the PCE ===
==== Traditional and non-conventional media ====
Apart from TV advertisements and printed advertisements on local newspapers, a dedicated website was established as the centralised platform of information dissemination. Social media ranging from Facebook, Twitter to YouTube were employed. Video-clips and publications tailor-made for stakeholders from diverse background and age groups were uploaded to ensure both laymen and experts could understand the Master Plan 2030 and its Public Consultation Exercise "as much as possible". Copies of the comprehensive Master Plan 2030 Public Consultation Booklet, technical reports and other relevant official publications are available for public viewing and collection at various locations covering 18 districts.

==== Roving exhibitions ====
Three rounds of roving exhibitions were conducted in different conveniently-located parts of the city such as the Hong Kong Convention and Exhibition Centre, CityWalk in Tsuen Wan and inside the airport to attract public participation. Airport Authority staff were also regularly stationed to address concerns.

=== Methodologies ===
Stakeholders included district councillors, professional bodies, industry partners, green groups and the general public.

==== Questionnaires ====
The Social Sciences Research Centre of the University of Hong Kong designed sets of questionnaires to solicit the public's views over their preferred option for airport expansion, taking into account eight independent factors. Both online and written forms were made available to the public via the website and in exhibitions. Feedback was received via written submissions, signature campaigns, online forums and electronic and printed media.

==== Interactive sessions ====
The Airport Authority conducted three public forums to facilitate face-to-face interaction with different stakeholders. 33 briefings and seminars were organised with experts and academia with technical expertise in different aspects. Apart from visits to all District Councils and attendance to the legislative council's meetings, five community liaison groups near the airport were established to incorporate residents' concerns.

=== Results ===
The Social Sciences Research Centre of the University of Hong Kong (2011) reported that 73% of the respondents to the 24,242 completed questionnaires preferred building the third runway. 80% deemed that decision concerning the adoption and implementation of the Master Plan 2030 should be made promptly.

Thus, the Airport Authority recommended the government build the third runway on 29 December 2001, followed by a decision made by the chief-executive-in-council in granting an in-principle approval of adopting the Third-Runway System for the future development of the airport.

=== Criticisms from the civil society ===
==== Environmental concerns ====
Various non-governmental organizations, claiming that Public Consultation Exercise was a "fake consultation", challenged its omittance of several environmental concerns.

Given the Third-Runway Project's possible environmental damage, WWF Hong Kong, Greenpeace and Friends of the Earth claimed that the over-emphasis of economic benefits and the downplaying of environmental costs undermined the objectivity of the Public Consultation Exercise. They asserted that the consultation omitted not only the thresholds of environmental sustainability, but also the increase of carbon emission attributed to the Project.

Green Sense Hong Kong claimed that Airport Authority, questioning the professional knowledge and independence of their consultants, had released misleading information regarding the impact on the Chinese white dolphins. Friends of the Earth suggested that incomplete data disrespected the public's right of acknowledgement and distorted the process of fair consultation. Hence, WWF Hong Kong suggested the suspension of the consultation before the relevant authorities disclose an in-depth analysis of the environmental impacts.

==== Conflict of interests ====
Green groups questioned the impartiality and objectivity of Public Consultation Exercise as the Airport Authority was the initiator of the Master Plan 2030 and the de facto executor of consultation. The Civic Party furthermore revealed that a conflict of interest may arise because the consultants of the Environmental Impact Assessment Report were employed directly by the proponent of the Project. Hence, they suggested the consultation be administered by the Government instead.

=== Judicial review ===
In February 2015, Ho Loy, a political activist in Hong Kong, applied for judicial review to challenge the Director of Environmental Protection's decisions to approve the Environmental Impact Assessment Report. She called the consultation "unlawful" as it did not provide sufficient environmental data. The Court, deciding that disclosure was not required as it contained sensitive documents, dismissed the claim.

=== Ultimate development ===
Owing to the dismissal of the judicial review and the lack of public concerns over the issues after the Public Consultation Exercise crisis, the Airport Authority had officially embarked on the implementation of the Master Plan 2030.

== See also ==
- Urmston Road
