= 99 Park Lane =

Residential building in London

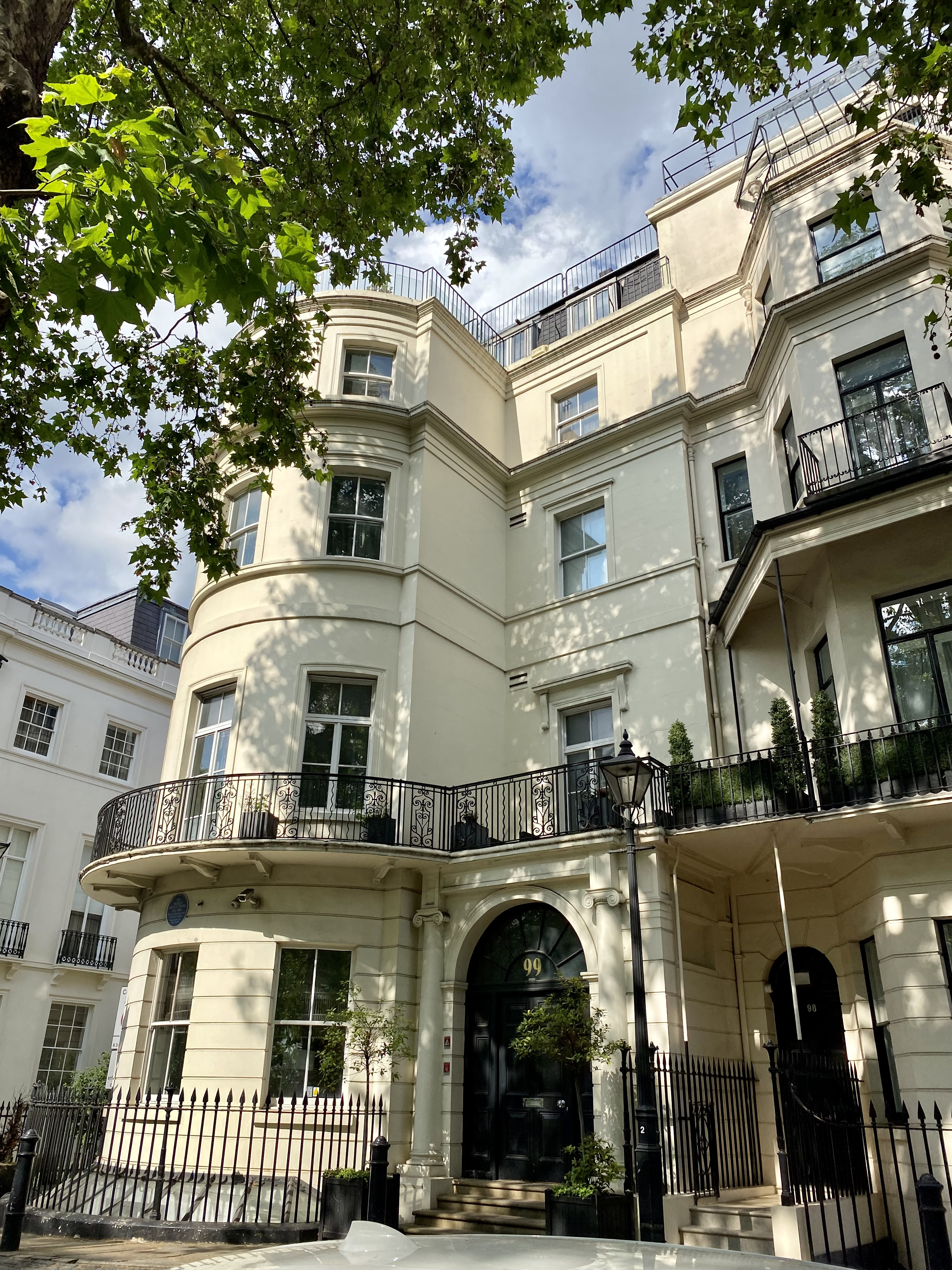

General information
- Type: Residential
- Location: London, England
- Coordinates: 51°30′38″N 0°09′23″W
- Completed: 1825

Listed Building – Grade II
- Official name: 99, PARK LANE W1
- Designated: 24 February 1958
- Reference no.: 1266048

99 Park Lane is a Grade II listed terraced house on the corner of Park Lane and Culross Street on the east side of Hyde Park in London.

== History and description ==
The house was built alongside its southern neighbour 98 Park Lane between 1823 and 1825 to designs by John Goldicutt. It is the larger of the two and occupies a superior plot.

It was first leased to Moses Montefiore in 1828 who lived there until his death in 1885. A Jewish activist, many of his meetings for humanitarian causes for Jewish people were held in the house. Upon his death, the building was reserved by the Grosvenor Estate for use by Lady Sibell Lumley, Countess Grosvenor and widow of Victor Grosvenor, Earl Grosvenor. Extensive alterations were carried out by William Cubitt and Company in preparation, including the demolition of the neighbouring building along Culross street to make room for an extension. The Countess Grosvenor moved in with her husband George Wyndham in 1889, with her son Hugh Grosvenor the future 2nd Duke of Westminster.

Other notable former residents include American actor and filmmaker Douglas Fairbanks who stayed at the house during his time in London and businessman David Wickins.

== See also ==
- 96 Park Lane
- 97 Park Lane
- 98 Park Lane
