= Brentwood County High School =

Brentwood County High School BCHS

Location
- Shenfield Common, Seven Arches Road; Brentwood, Essex, CM14 4JF; England; 51.6161°N 0.3082°E

Information
- Type: Academy
- Established: 1913 (Re-Opened 2017)
- Local authority: Essex
- Department for Education URN: 145474 Tables
- Ofsted: Reports
- Head of School: Stephen Bonnar
- Staff: approx. 90
- Gender: Coeducational
- Age: 11 to 18
- Enrolment: 842
- Houses: Athenians; Corinthians; Romans; Spartans; Trojans
- Colours: Navy Blue; Royal Blue; Platinum
- Website: http://www.bchs.essex.sch.uk/

Brentwood County High School (colloquially referred to as BCHS) is a state-funded academy (formerly a grammar school) located in the town of Brentwood, Essex. The school is a member of the Osborne Co-Operative Academies Trust and educates 842 students from East London and South West Essex. On 1 September 2017 the school was re-opened as a member of the Osborne Co-Operative Academy Trust. In an Ofsted report on 7 June 2022 the school was rated as 'Good'.

== The School ==
The school is on a single site consisting of grammar school buildings originally built in 1927. After the school's conversion from a girls' grammar school in 1972, a linking extension was added where science, art and design, and technology are taught. Facilities include a drama hall, sports hall, gymnasium, fitness suite, library, sports field, and indoor swimming pool.

=== History ===
Brentwood County High School, Seven Arches Road site in 1927

In 1913, a private school for girls which originally opened in 1876, was taken over by Essex County Council opening with only fifty-four students as a girls' grammar school.

In 1927, the school moved from Queen's Road, Brentwood to its current site at Seven Arches Road, Brentwood. Extensions were added by 1937 to provide accommodation for 450 girls. During the grammar school era of the 1960s and early 1970s, it was the female counterpart of Brentwood School, which was a boys' direct grant grammar school at that time.

The school celebrated its Golden Jubilee in 1963 and then in 1965 plans were laid to convert it from a girls' grammar school into a co-educational school which, after extensive building works, happened in September 1978.

In 2013, the school celebrated its centenary year and became a voluntary aided school by converting to foundation school status forming the Brentwood Community Learning Trust.

Since 2017, the school has been part of the Osborne Co-Operative Academy Trust. The trust is based around a group of schools in Thurrock, including St Clere's secondary school. St Clere's was the original school in the trust which has now expanded to include two secondary schools and four primary schools.

Brentwood County High School will be undergoing a major rebuilding and refurbishment programme from the summer of 2017. The rebuilding and building of the new areas will start in the summer of 2021, funded by the Education and Schools Funding Agency (part of the Department for Education). The building works are planned to include the construction of a new science, art, and technology block to replace the blue 1970s block which will be knocked down. The rest of the school will be completely refurbished. The building programme is expected to take three years to complete (estimated 2024).

=== Sport ===
The school's rugby teams compete at a national level, winning the Carnegie Cup in 2008, and coming as runners-up in 2009. The school also has successful football, netball, swimming and water polo teams which compete at a regional level.

As well as this, BCHS was partnered with the West Ham United Foundation, as a hub school, from 2016.

== Awards ==
Brentwood County High School has achieved Eco-School status by being awarded four Green Flags and an Energy Award by Keep Britain Tidy. The school is one of only 23 schools to be awarded four Green Flags.

The school also holds National Healthy School Status (NHSS) and has won awards for the school's education of English and Humanities from the Prince's Institute of Teaching and the Geographical Association, as well as the Sportsmark award for the provision of physical education.

== Sixth Form ==
BCHS hosts one of two campuses for the Osborne Sixth Form and it has around 200 students studying A-Levels and Level 3 BTECs. Students attending the sixth form are a mixture of students who attended BCHS up to year 11, and a number who join the school for year 12.

== Notable former pupils ==
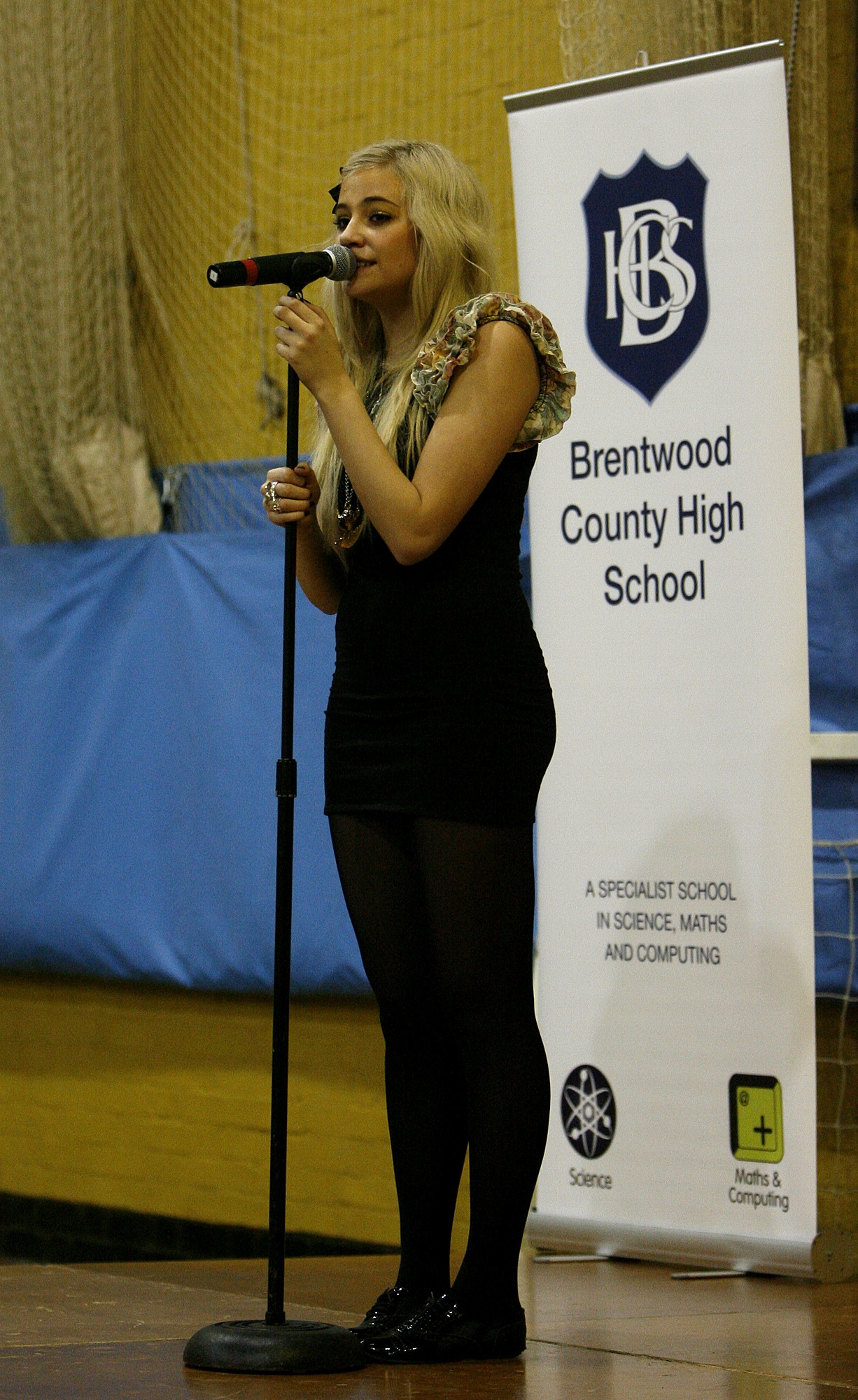
Pixie Lott performing at the school in 2010.

- Chris and Jeff Galvin, the world's first Michelin star brothers who own and run 3 restaurants in London and Essex. (Their previous portfolio was 14).
- Gary Webster, actor, (Ray Daley in Minder). He has also appeared in 4 British soap operas - Eastenders, Hollyoaks, Crossroads and Family Affairs.
- Pixie Lott, singer, who returned to the school in 2010 to perform a concert and answer questions from students
- Jonjo Shelvey, footballer
- William Lloyd, Conservative Party Councillor
- Liz Jones, journalist and writer
- Joan Sims, actress in Carry On films
- Patricia Hodgson, broadcasting executive
