= 96 Park Lane =

Residential building in London

General information
- Type: Residential
- Location: London, England
- Coordinates: 51°30′37″N 0°09′22″W
- Completed: 1826

Listed Building – Grade II
- Official name: 96, PARK LANE W1
- Designated: 24 February 1958
- Reference no.: 1226026

96 Park Lane is a Grade II listed terraced house on Park Lane on the east side of Hyde Park in London.

== History and description ==
The house was leased by William Thornton, who lived next door at No. 95 from 1797 and renewed in 1811. The tenant Edward Pelham Brenton in 1826 saw the rebuilding of the house however, in line with the rebuilding of houses along the rest of the terrace at the time. The new house was originally given the address 4 Grosvenor Gate and later 32 Park Lane, let early on to William Montagu, 5th Duke of Manchester. Additions were made in 1894 with a conservatory and in 1903 when White Allom and Company made alterations for the tenant Rufus Isaacs. The interior was thoroughly redecorated again in 1973 by Hildebrand and Glicker.

Other notable occupants of the house and its predecessor include composer Thomas Sanders Dupuis, judge Montague Edward Smith and James Calder of Calders & Grandidge.

== Design ==
The house is built in the Regency style with a stuccoed front consisting entirely of a single bow and a slate mansard roof with dormers. Similarly to its neighbours it has a tented veranda balcony.

== See also ==
- 94 Park Lane
- 95 Park Lane
- 97 Park Lane
