= 95 Park Lane =

Residential building in London

General information
- Type: Residential
- Location: London, England
- Coordinates: 51°30′37″N 0°09′22″W
- Completed: 1844

Listed Building – Grade II
- Official name: 95, PARK LANE W1
- Designated: 24 February 1958
- Reference no.: 1226025

95 Park Lane is a Grade II listed terraced house on Park Lane on the east side of Hyde Park in London.

== History and description ==
The house is a relative latecomer to the terrace, as the tenant previous tenant, William Thornton, had managed to renew his lease in 1811, occupying it until his death in 1840. The new house was built between 1842 and 1844 by John Harrison.

It is unique among the terrace in design also, with an exterior of brick rather than stucco and taller than its neighbours.

Notable occupants of the house include Colonel Algernon Durand.

== Design ==
While built into the reign of Queen Victoria its design remains fundamentally Georgian inkeeping with its neighbours. The house is six storeys with a bay running the full height.

== See also ==
- 93 Park Lane
- 94 Park Lane
- 96 Park Lane
