= 98 Park Lane =

Residential building in London

General information
- Type: Residential
- Location: London, England
- Coordinates: 51°30′38″N 0°09′23″W
- Completed: 1825

Listed Building – Grade II
- Official name: 98, PARK LANE W1
- Designated: 24 February 1958
- Reference no.: 1226027

98 Park Lane is a Grade II listed terraced house on Park Lane on the east side of Hyde Park in London.

== History and description ==
The tenant Susannah Curtis's lease was renewed in 1822 with the intention of allowing for a new house to be built which was completed between 1823 and 1825. It was built alongside its northern neighbour 99 Park Lane to designs by John Goldicutt. The smaller of the two it was considered a townhouse of the "second rate", with the upper floors originally fronted in brick with stucco reserved for the lower levels.

After the expiry of the lease in 1886, interior refurbishment was carried out by William Cubitt and Company. Similarly to some of its neighbours, redecoration was also done in the French style around 1900. Some original interior details remain, particularly on the staircase.

Notable former occupants of the house and its predecessor include George Lumley-Saunderson, 5th Earl of Scarbrough, Joseph Hyacinthe François de Paule de Rigaud, Comte de Vaudreuil, Major-General Henry Bunbury, diplomat Augustus Foster, physician Archibald Billing, and author Frank Harris.

== See also ==
- 97 Park Lane
- 99 Park Lane
