= 97 Park Lane =

Residential building in London

General information
- Type: Residential
- Location: London, England
- Coordinates: 51°30′37″N 0°09′22″W
- Completed: 1827

Listed Building – Grade II
- Official name: 97, PARK LANE W1
- Designated: 24 February 1958
- Reference no.: 1266047

97 Park Lane is a Grade II listed terraced house on Park Lane on the east side of Hyde Park in London.

== History and description ==
The house was a rebuild of between 1826 and 1827. It was possibly built alongside its neighbour 96 Park Lane built around the same time. The 1828 tenant was Harriet Scott-Waring sub-let the property to the Duchess of Marlborough until 1835.

Alterations were carried out in 1893 with a storey added, and again in 1900. In 1914, the possibility of rebuilding the house entirely was raised but such ideas were quashed by the outbreak of the First World War.

Other notable former occupants of the house and its predecessor include painter Joseph Groupy, surgeon John William Fisher and the 8th Viscount Molesworth.

== Design ==
The house is built in the Regency style with a stuccoed front consisting entirely of a single bay Similarly to its neighbours it has a tented veranda balcony.

== See also ==
- 96 Park Lane
- 98 Park Lane
