= Jeff Galvin =

English restauranteur (born 1969)

- Born: 1969 (age 56–57)
- Occupation: Restauranter
- Relatives: Chris Galvin (brother)
- Website: galvinrestaurants.com

Jeff Galvin (born 1969) is a London restaurateur who, with his older brother Chris Galvin, has established a number of high-profile restaurants.

== Early career ==
Galvin began his career as a pot-washer for celebrity chef Anthony Worrall Thompson.

After completing catering college, Galvin began his career at the Savoy Hotel in London, working as a commis chef under the direction of Anton Edelman, before taking the role of junior sous chef at David Levin's Michelin-starred Capital Hotel beneath chef Philip Britten.

In 1994, Galvin was appointed as sous chef at Chez Nico by Nico Ladenis in Park Lane, London.

Galvin worked with his brother Chris Galvin for the opening of the restaurant Orrery in Marylebone in 1997 before going on to work with David Levin again when he was appointed as head chef at The Greenhouse restaurant in Mayfair.

His next step was to be appointed as head chef at Marco Pierre White's restaurant Oak Room (working under the direction of Robert Reid), and then in May 2000 Galvin was appointed as executive chef at L'Escargot – another of Marco Pierre White's restaurants.

== The family partnership ==
In September 2005 Galvin teamed up with his brother Chris to launch their first venture together — Galvin Bistrot de Luxe.

Then in May 2006 the Galvin brothers launched Galvin at Windows on the 28th floor of the London Hilton on Park Lane. In 2010 Galvin at Windows gained its first Michelin star.

In November 2009 the Galvin brothers opened their first restaurants in the City of London — La Chapelle and Cafe a Vin.

In 2012 the Galvin brothers opened their first venture outside of London — The Pompadour and Galvin Brasserie de Luxe in Edinburgh as part of the newly refurbished Caledonian hotel.
