= Hilton bombing =

Hilton bombing may refer to:

- London Hilton bombing, 1975
- Sydney Hilton Hotel bombing, 1978
