= Galvin at Windows =

Defunct restaurant in London, England

- Interactive map of Galvin at Windows

Restaurant information
- Established: May 2006 (19 years ago)
- Closed: 25 April 2024 (21 months ago)
- Food type: French cuisine
- Location: Park Lane, London, W1, England, U.K.
- Coordinates: 51.5057°N 0.1503°W
- Other information: Nearest station: Hyde Park Corner
- Website: galvinatwindows.com, official website

Galvin at Windows was a restaurant located on the top floor of the London Hilton on Park Lane hotel In the Mayfair district of London, United Kingdom.

Launched in May 2006 by chef Chris Galvin as the second restaurant from the Galvin brothers, the restaurant was awarded a Michelin Star in 2007, which it maintained until 2020. The restaurant closed in April 2024.

== History and operations ==
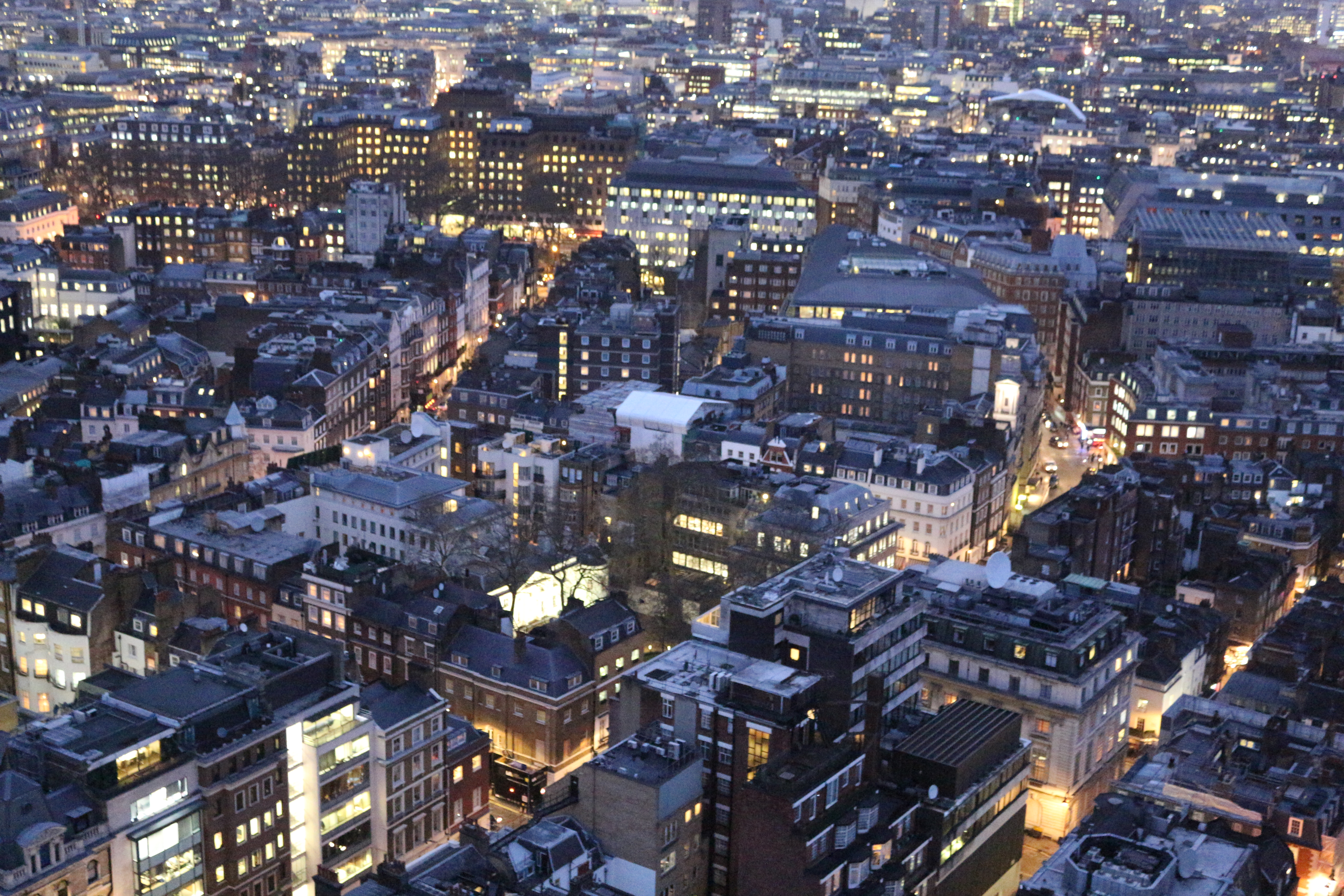
View from the bar, Galvin at Windows

Until December 2019, the general manager was Fred Sirieix, who is also a writer, broadcaster and charity activist.

As a Michelin-rated restaurant, it offered seasonally inspired modern French haute cuisine with regularly changing menus which took in a wide range on influences, including head chef Joo Won's Korean heritage, while retaining its focus on classical French techniques. It also offered traditional Sunday lunches and hosted wine dinners and tastings which drew on global cuisines.

The bar offered a wide range of premium wines, spirits and classic cocktails while also having a seasonally changing menu of special drinks and a light, more-relaxed food menu.

The restaurant was known for its panoramic views onto Hyde Park facing west and across central London to the north and south, while the bar looked across central London to the north, east and south.

== See also ==
- List of French restaurants
- List of restaurants in London
