= Chris Galvin =

Chris Galvin may refer to:

- Chris Galvin (chef) (born 1958), English chef
- Chris Galvin (footballer) (1951), English professional footballer
- Christopher Galvin, American businessman
