= William Lloyd (councillor) =

British politician

William Albert Lloyd (born 1 November 1988) is a British politician, who served as the Councillor for Warley in Brentwood, Essex from 2007 to 2015.

He was elected in the May 2007 local elections to represent the Conservatives, becoming one of the youngest people to be elected to official office in Britain at the age of 18, the minimum age for candidates having been lowered from 21 to 18 the previous year. He was re-elected in 2011 but later left the party to lead the newly formed Brentwood First group. He stood down in 2015 and re-joined the Conservative Party in 2016.

At the time he was elected, Lloyd was also Head Boy of Brentwood County High School and studying A-levels.
