= 94 Park Lane =

Residential building in London

General information
- Type: Residential
- Location: London, England
- Coordinates: 51°30′37″N 0°09′22″W
- Completed: 1825

Listed Building – Grade II
- Official name: 94, PARK LANE W1
- Designated: 24 February 1958
- Reference no.: 1226024

94 Park Lane is a Grade II listed terraced house on Park Lane on the east side of Hyde Park in London.

== History and description ==
The house was built between 1823 and 1825, originally as 2 Grosvenor Gate by Samuel Baxter alongside its southern neighbour 93 Park Lane. The two houses were stuccoed with bows towards the park but differ in their design, with No. 94 smaller than its neighbour and with shorter storey heights.

Alterations were carried out in 1874 by C. and W. Moxon, and in 1900 by Charles Mellier and Company when it was largely redecorated in the French style.

Notable occupants of the house include composer Joseph Kelway, soldier and aristocrat Philip Grey Egerton and MPs Laurance Lyon and Robert Bourke.

== Design ==
The design is a relatively typical Regency stuccoed townhouse design, although on a narrow plot. The building has a basement and dormered mansard roof, as well as an off centre bow.

== See also ==
- 93 Park Lane
- 95 Park Lane
