= Chris Galvin (chef) =

Chris Galvin (born c. 1958) is an English chef whose career has spanned over thirty years working in restaurants and hotels in both the United Kingdom and the United States.

== Biography ==
Galvin and his younger brother Jeff grew up in Brentwood, Essex. Their mother worked as a pot washer in a local restaurant.

Originally inspired by the cooking of his grandmother, Galvin started his career in a small neighbourhood restaurant as a pot washer for Antony Worrall Thompson, before taking up a position as a commis chef at the Ritz hotel in London under the direction of Michael Quinn. Galvin was then recruited by chef Paul Gayler to join the kitchen team at restaurant Inigo Jones. Gayler also subsequently recruited Galvin to join the kitchen team at the Lanesborough hotel where he was appointed as Executive Sous Chef.

Galvin teamed up again with Worrall Thompson in New York City as Head Chef at Ménage à Trois. before returning to the UK in 1997 to join Conran Restaurants where he worked with Terence Conran for 10 years; opening restaurants Mezzo, Bluebird and as co-founder of Almeida. The launch of Orrery where he worked for many years, saw him achieve his first Michelin star in 2000. In 2003 Galvin was appointed by Jeremy King and Chris Corbin to open the Wolseley restaurant.

== Galvin Restaurants ==
In 2005 Galvin and brother Jeff Galvin opened their first solo venture - Galvin Bistrot de Luxe in Baker Street. The restaurant was recognised as the Best French Restaurant for two years running and Best Wine list in 2009.

In May 2006, the brothers launched Galvin at Windows, on the 28th floor of the London Hilton Hotel on Park Lane, with André Garrett (ex- Orrery) as their Head Chef. In 2010 Galvin at Windows gained its first Michelin star. In November 2009 the Galvin brothers opened their first restaurants in the City of London; La Chapelle and Café à Vin, which has since been rebranded as Galvin Bistrot & Bar, a French bistro in London's Spitalfields. Galvin La Chapelle gained a Michelin star in the 2011 Red Guide with Café à Vin awarded a Michelin Bib Gourmand. In 2012 the Galvin brothers opened their first venture outside London; The Pompadour by Galvin and Galvin Brasserie de Luxe in Edinburgh located in the newly refurbished Caledonian, a Waldorf Astoria hotel on Princes Street.
