= London Marriott Hotel Park Lane =

Hotel in London

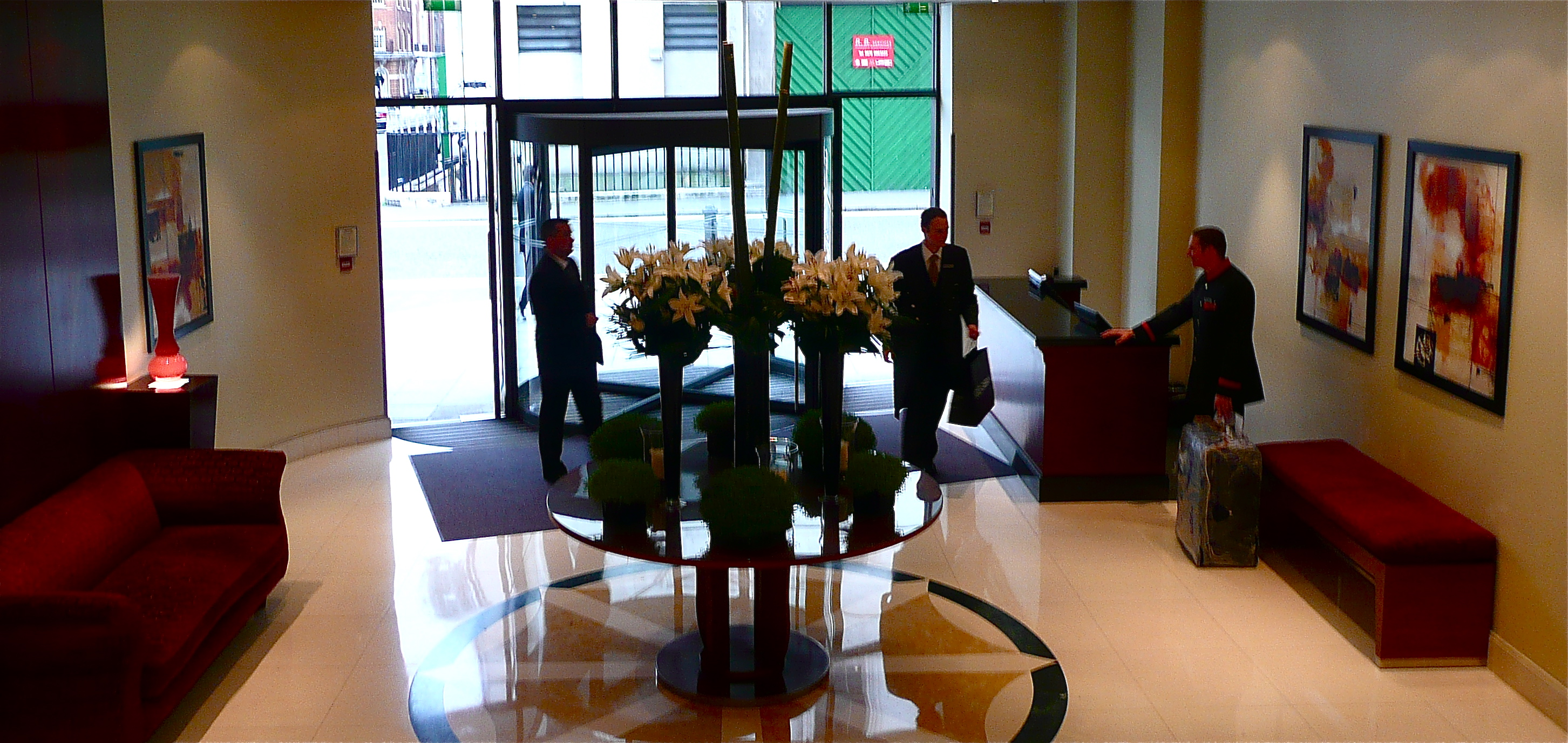
- Hotel lobby

- Location within Central London

General information
- Location: 140 Park Lane, London, England, United Kingdom
- Coordinates: 51°30′47″N 0°9′29″W

Other information
- Number of rooms: 152

Website
- https://www.marriott.com/hotels/travel/lonpl-london-marriott-hotel-park-lane/

London Marriott Hotel Park Lane is a hotel in London, England. It is located at 140 Park Lane and is run by the Marriott Hotels group. The site was once occupied by Somerset House and Camelford House.

The hotel has 152 bedrooms all of which were refurbished, alongside the rest of the hotel, in 2015.

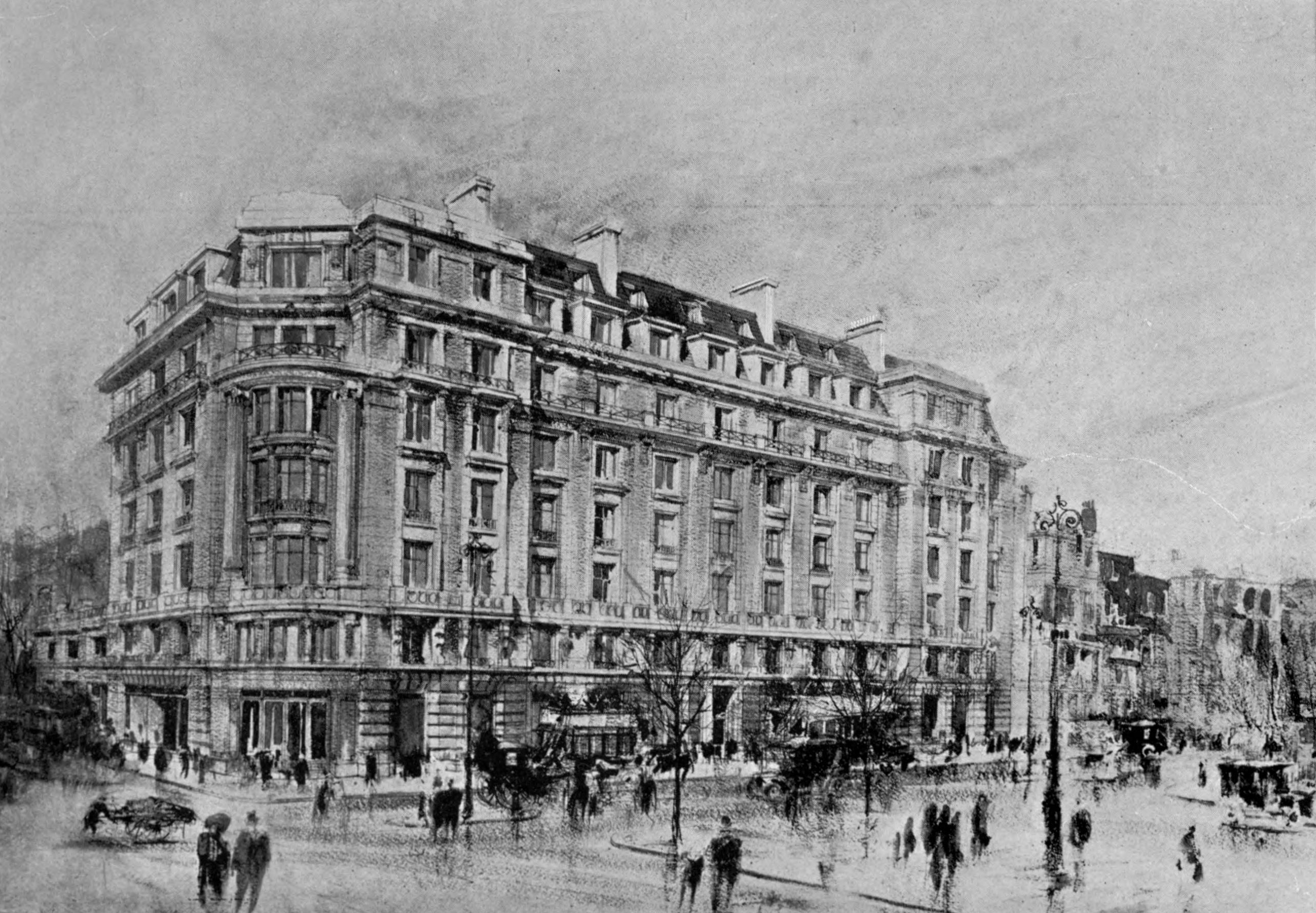
Illustration of the building, designed by Frank Verity

The site also occupies 138 Park Lane which was featured as a Home Guard Headquarters in the film The Life and Death of Colonel Blimp.
