= Somerset House, Park Lane =

Building in City of Westminster, London, England

Coordinates: 51°30′47″N 0°9′28″W

Somerset House (built 1769–70; demolished 1915), was an 18th-century town house on the east side of Park Lane, where it meets Oxford Street, in the Mayfair area of London. It was also known as 40 Park Lane, although a renumbering means that the site is now called 140 Park Lane.

The freehold of the house was always with the Grosvenor family, while the successive owners of the lease were the 2nd Viscount Bateman, followed by Warren Hastings, a former Governor-General of India, the third Earl of Rosebery, the Dukes of Somerset, after whom the house took its longest-surviving name, and finally the publisher George Murray Smith and his widow.

== Lord Bateman, 1769–1789 ==
The house was built between 1769 and 1770 for John Bateman, 2nd Viscount Bateman and was designed by the master carpenter John Phillips, who was the "undertaker" for the whole north-west corner of the Grosvenor estate.

The new house was built with one side facing Park Lane, the main entrance being from a courtyard which continued the line of Hereford Street. It had four storeys above ground, with bay windows extending through the floors. One bay faced Park Lane, and two more faced the garden, which ran down to North Row. Although all surviving pictures of the house show it cased in stucco, at the outset the façades may have been bare brick, with the windows dressed in Portland stone. On the ground floor, the entrance hall was paved in Portland stone and leading from it were the dining room, the drawing room and a dressing room. The staircase rose from the hall, with stone steps and iron railings, to the second floor, which had three principal rooms, including Lady Bateman's bedroom and her dressing room. Of the chimneypieces in the main rooms, some cost £25 each, others £50.

At the northern end of the courtyard, where it met Oxford Street, there was a stable building, and under it with the kitchen, connected to the house by an underground passage from basement to basement.

Bateman agreed to pay Phillips £7,000 for the work to complete the house.

== Warren Hastings, 1789–1797 ==
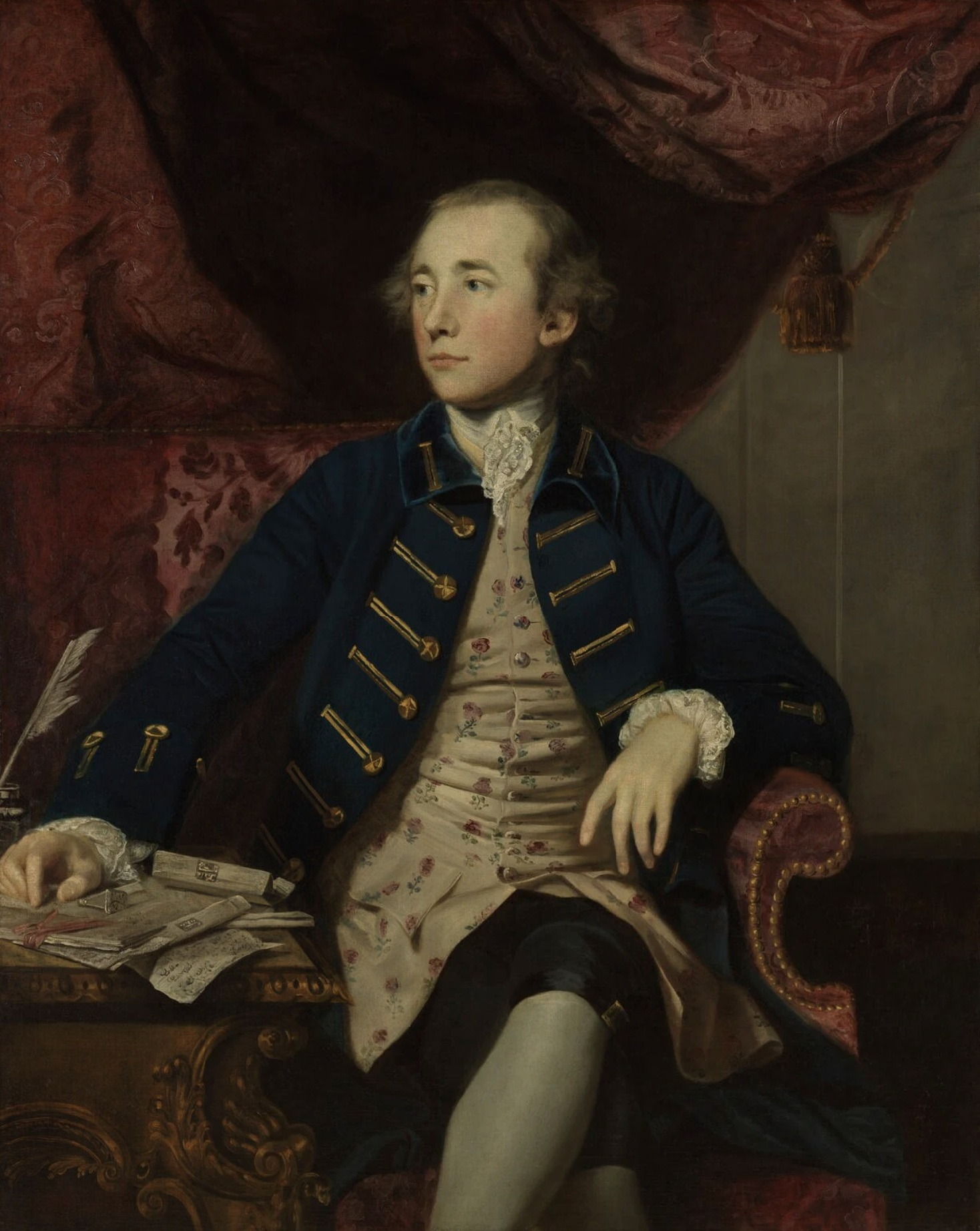
Hastings, by Reynolds

In 1789 Bateman sold the house to Warren Hastings, a former Governor-General of India, for about £8,000, of which half was paid at once, with Hastings moving in during November 1789. This was shortly after he had been impeached, and he used the house as his London home throughout several years of a long trial which led to his acquittal in 1795. In 1797 he sold the house at auction, when it was bought by Neil Primrose, 3rd Earl of Rosebery for £9,450. Rosebery was offered the pictures on the walls but declined them, and Hastings later noted in his diary that they were "sold at Christie's for nothing".

== Lord Rosebery, 1797–1808 ==
Little is known of Lord Rosebery's eleven years of occupation. In 1808 the house was sold to Edward St Maur, 11th Duke of Somerset (1775–1855), when it was described as "a very good one".

== Dukes of Somerset, 1808–1885 ==
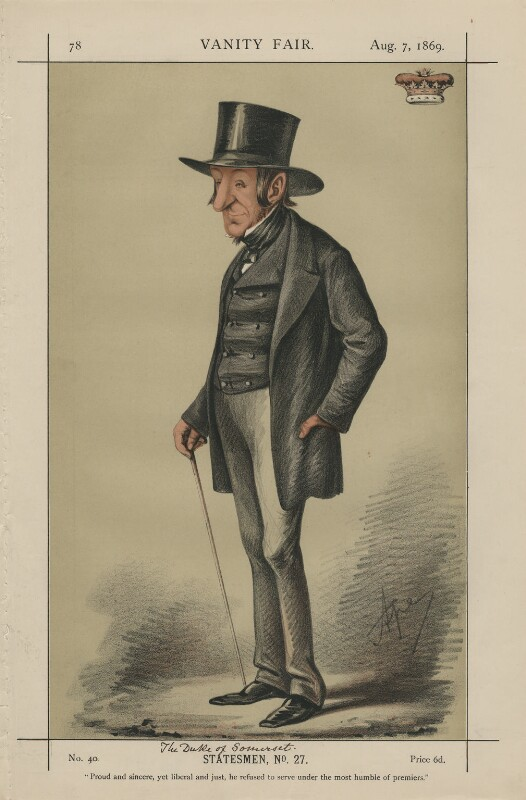
The 12th Duke of Somerset

The 11th Duke renamed the house "Somerset House", which Sir John Colville later called "a shade presumptuous of him, for there was another more splendid establishment bearing the name..." The house thus became the third 'Somerset House' in London.

The Duke negotiated unsuccessfully with his neighbour Lord Grenville, who lived at Camelford House, Park Lane, as he wished to add to his new house, but enlarging it to the south would have detracted from Camelford, so in 1810 Somerset approached Robert Grosvenor, 2nd Earl Grosvenor about building in the courtyard between the house and the stables. However, there was doubt about the status of the yard, and Grosvenor thought the extension would darken Hereford Street.

In 1813 the Duke wrote to his brother, Lord Webb John Seymour (1777–1819), about his wife: "Charlotte is as busy as a bee upon a bank of thyme. Furnishing her house has been one occupation, and she has the fashionable predilection for old things". In 1819 the Duke again thought of building on his garden, and after negotiations with Grenville and Grosvenor a short two-storey extension close to the windows of the library at Camelford House was built, and in 1821 or 1822 a single-storey entrance corridor was added on the north side.

The Duke's first duchess died at Somerset House in 1827, and he himself died there in 1855. After that, his second wife remained at the house until she died in 1880. Edward Seymour, 12th Duke of Somerset made repairs, carried out by William Cubitt and Co., but after he died in 1885 the house was empty for some years.

The 12th Duke used the address "40, Park Lane". He left the house to his daughter Lady Hermione Graham, who became a widow in 1888. In 1890, she and her son Sir Richard Graham sold it to George Murray Smith, of Smith, Elder & Co., the publishers.

== The Murray Smiths, 1890–1915 ==
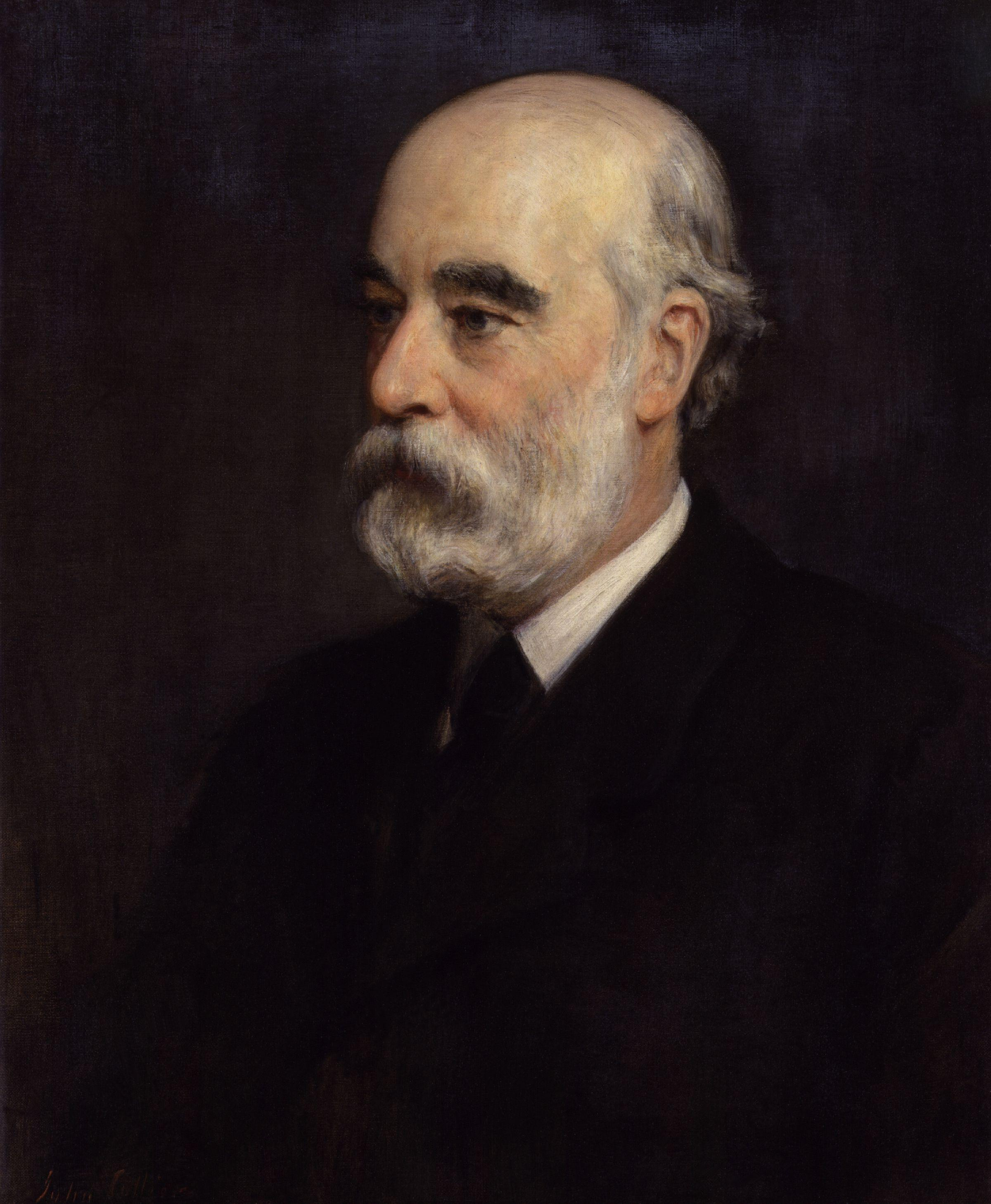
George Murray Smith

George Murray Smith, born in 1824, occupied the house, which became known as 40, Park Lane, until he died in 1901. The lease continued in his family until 1915, his widow remaining living there until May 1914, but in 1906, negotiations began for the redevelopment of the Somerset House site together with Camelford House. The 2nd Duke of Westminster, as freeholder, was uneasy about allowing the two demolitions, "having regard to No. 40 having historical associations", but in the end he agreed to the scheme. Camelford House was demolished in 1913. When Mrs Murray Smith left she claimed that the house possessed "vaults with chains in them", including a cell said to have been used for prisoners being taken to Tyburn, but when this was investigated by the Grosvenor estate surveyor, Edmund Wimperis, he found nothing of the kind.

== Demolition ==
In 1901, a writer in The Architectural Review complained that Park Lane's former "casual elegance" was being replaced by a "frippery and extravagance" which looked like converting it into another Fifth Avenue. In 1905 a newspaper noted that "the thoroughfare is becoming a less popular place of residence, eight of the houses being to be let or sold". Soon, there were complaints of noise from motor buses, and by 1909 property values had fallen. These factors led to the demolition of the house in 1915, to be replaced by the first flats built in Park Lane. There was public opposition to the development, but the flats, designed by Frank Verity, were built on the site in 1915–19.

When Somerset House was demolished, four of its chimneypieces were moved to other houses of the Grosvenor estate. Two went to 11, Green Street, and two to 50, Park Street, where they were still surviving in 1980. The site is now occupied by the Marriott London Park Lane.
