= Keith Clifford Hall =

- Born: 29 March 1910; Cambridge, U.K.
- Died: 16 December 1964 (aged 54); Bergen, Norway
- Occupation: ophthalmic optician

Keith Clifford Hall (born 29 March 1910, Cambridge - d. 16 December 1964, Bergen) was a British ophthalmic optician and pioneer of contact lenses.

== Early life ==
Keith Clifford Hall was born on 29 March 1910 in Cambridge and educated in Surrey. He left school at 17 and became an optician's apprentice in Bracknell. He studied for the Fellowship in Optometry of the Worshipful Company of Spectacle Makers (FSMC) at night school, qualifying in 1931.

== Career ==
Hall began fitting contact lenses in 1934. After World War II he became one of the world’s leading contact lens specialists, and set up the first UK specialist contact lens practice during 1945 at 139 Park Lane in London. With F. Dickinson, he wrote one of the first post-war text books on contact lens, “An Introduction to the Prescribing of Contact Lenses”(1946).

Keith Clifford Hall was one of the first opticians in the world to specialise in contact lens practice. His technique used scleral fitting shells which were modified with wax prior to machining. He also worked with the original Touhy corneal lens. His practice expanded and he moved to larger rooms next door. His consulting rooms on the 6th floor of 140 Park Lane became a centre of excellence for many visiting specialists. He also lectured on contact lens practice around the world. A founder member of the Contact Lens Society, Keith Clifford Hall was President 1947-48 and 1963-64.

== Death and legacy ==
Keith Clifford Hall died in Bergen on 16 December 1964.

His work is commemorated by a collection of literature held for reference in the library of the College of Optometrists

He is also commemorated by a plaque at the site of his consulting rooms, 140 Park Lane.
