= London Hilton bombing =

1975 explosion at the Hilton Hotel in London

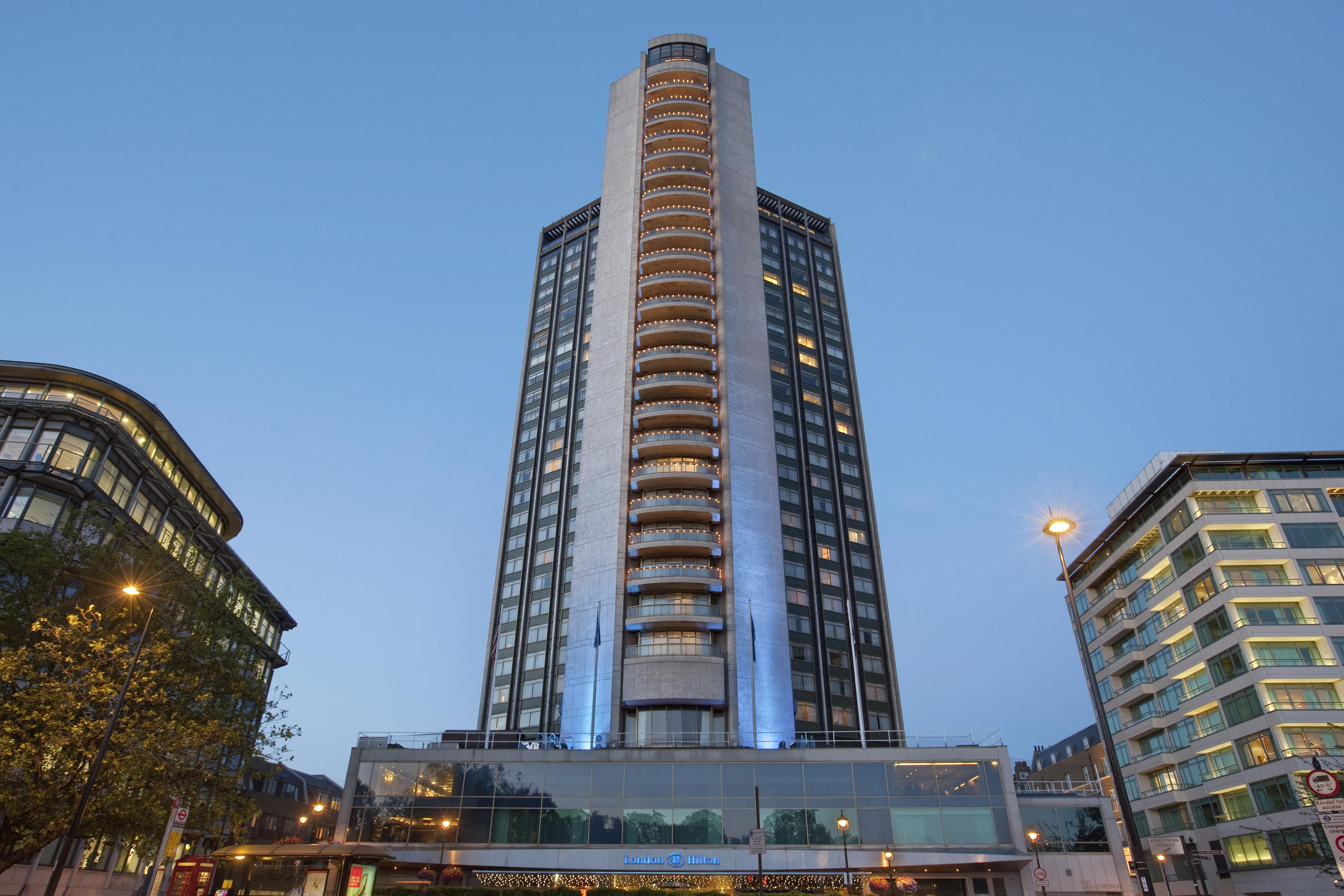
- The London Hilton
- Location: 51.5054°N 0.1504°W; Hilton Hotel, Park Lane, London, UK
- Date: 5 September 1975; 12:18 (UTC+1)
- Target: Hilton Hotel, London
- Attack type: Bombing
- Weapon: Home-made bomb
- Deaths: 2
- Injuries: 63
- Perpetrators: Provisional Irish Republican Army, Balcombe Street Gang

On 5 September 1975 a bomb exploded in the lobby of the Hilton Hotel on Park Lane, London, killing two people and injuring 63.

== Bombing ==
Ten minutes before the explosion, the Daily Mail newspaper received a warning by telephone. Having been notified, Scotland Yard immediately sent three officers to investigate, but they were not able to evacuate the building before the bomb exploded at 12:18 BST. The Provisional IRA claimed responsibility for the bombing. Police worked quickly to clear the area after the explosion fearing there could be another device nearby. The blast caused extensive damage to the hotel and neighbouring shops with broken glass spread over a wide area. Witnesses said police arrived only five minutes before the bomb went off, and it is not clear whether the hotel was warned before they turned up. A spokesman for the Metropolitan Police said an officer telephoned the Hilton shortly after receiving the warning, but the hotel denied this. "A policeman was just telling the assistant manager that he had better evacuate when the bomb went off," said press officer Anne Crewdson.

== Second bombing ==
A second attempt to bomb the London Hilton hotel was made on 7 September 1992. The explosion caused slight damage in a lavatory on the ground floor but nobody was injured.
