= John William Fisher =

British surgeon

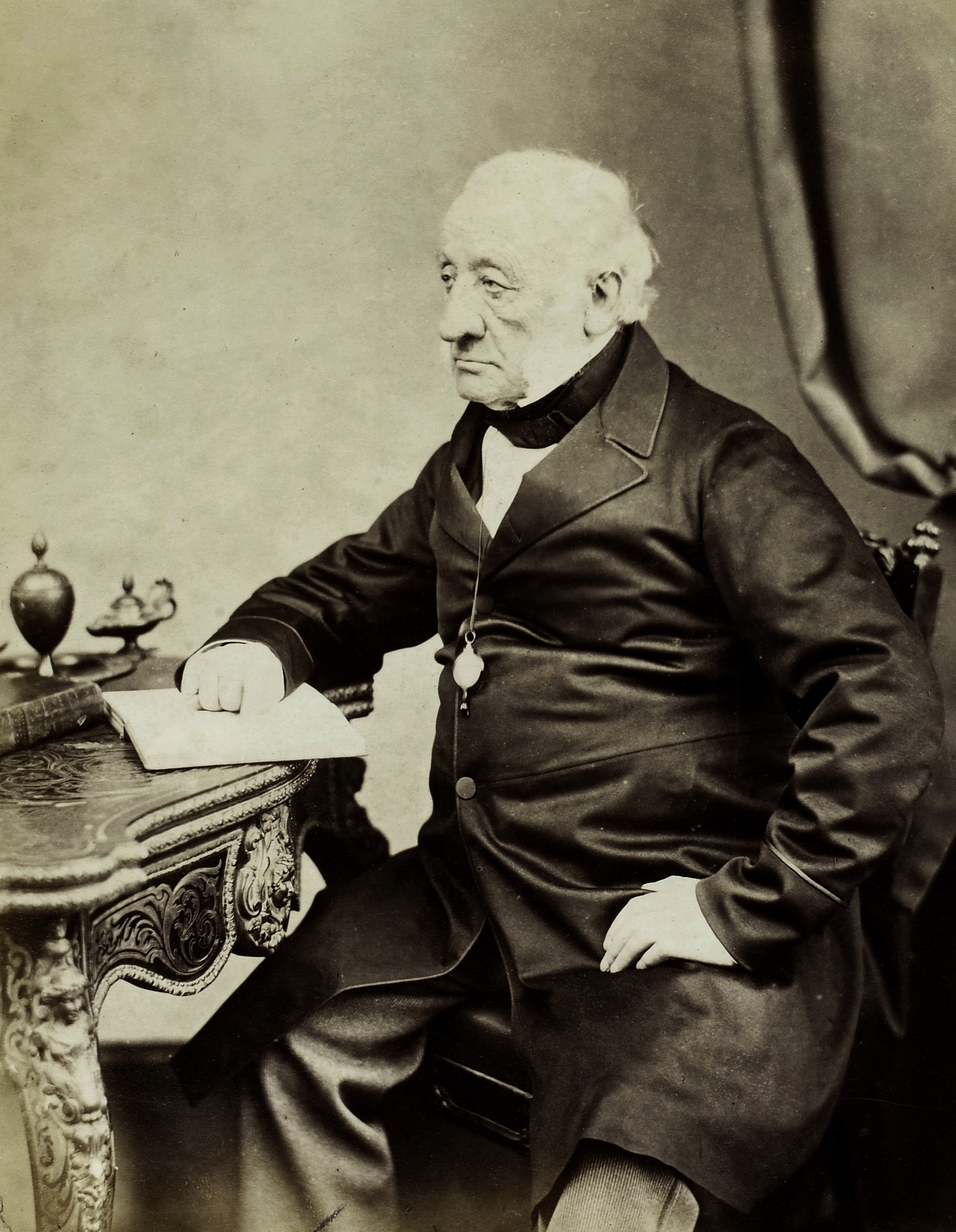
John William Fisher in 1863

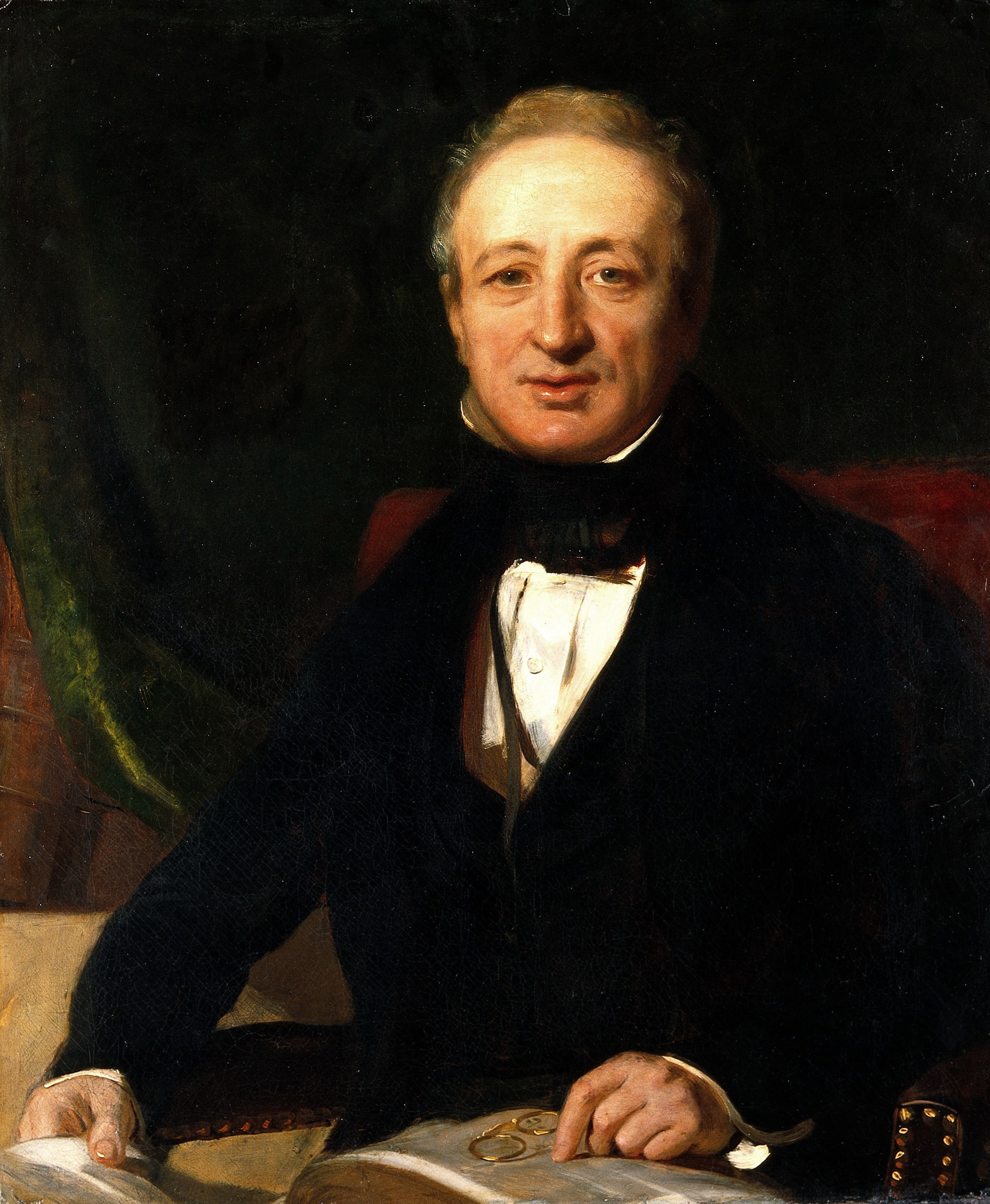
John William Fisher by John Prescott Knight

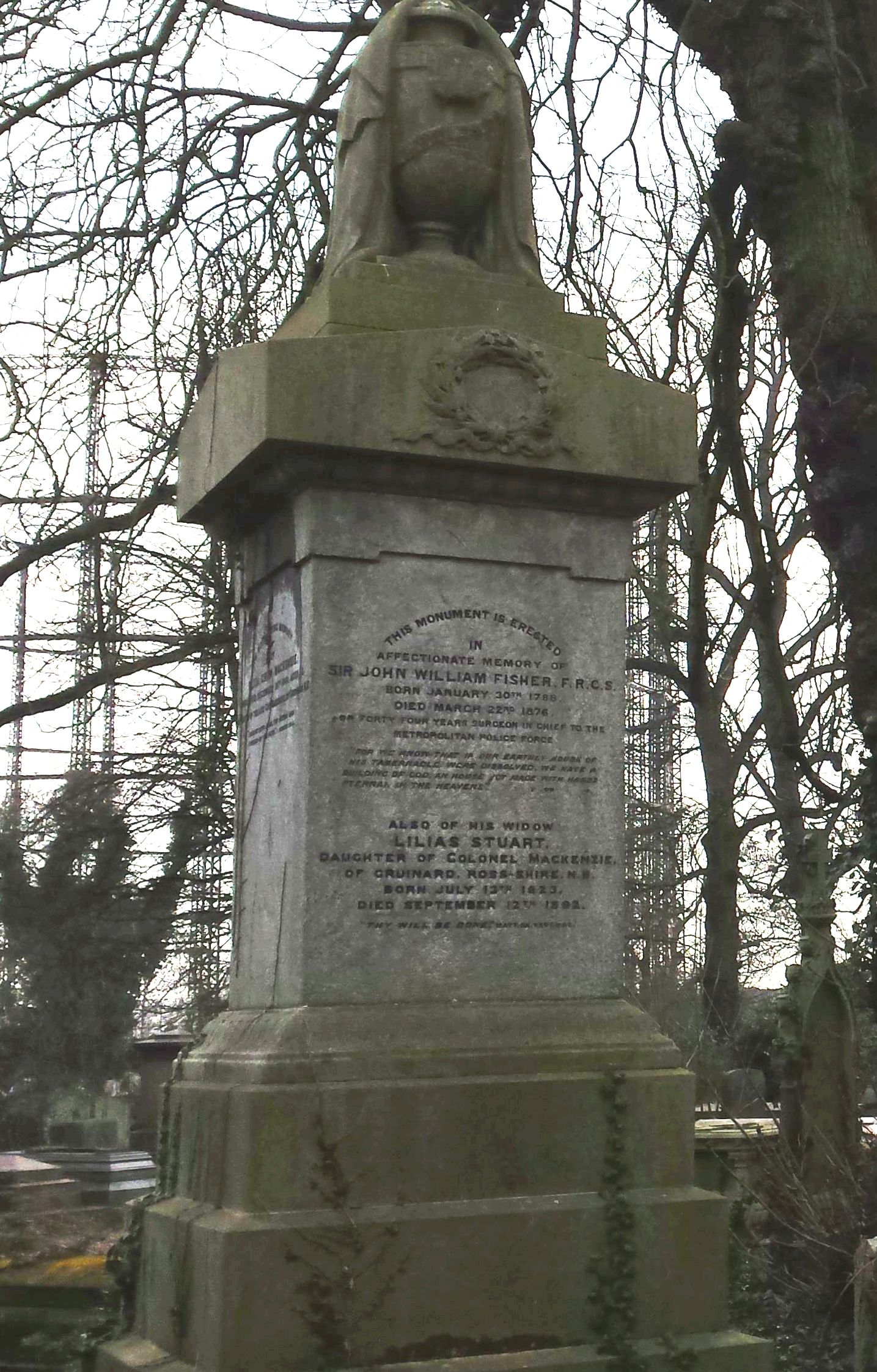
Monument for John William Fisher at Kensal Green Cemetery

Sir John William Fisher (30 January 1788 – 22 March 1876) was a British surgeon.

== Life ==
Fisher, son of Peter Fisher of Perth, by Mary, daughter of James Kennay of York, was born in London 30 January 1788, and apprenticed to John Andrews, a surgeon enjoying a large practice. After studying at St. George's and Westminster Hospitals, he was admitted member of the Royal College of Surgeons in 1809, became a fellow in 1836, and was a member of the council in 1843. The University of Erlangen conferred on him the degree of M.D. in 1841.

He was appointed surgeon to the Bow Street patrol in 1821 by Lord Sidmouth, and promoted to the post of Superintending Surgeon to the Metropolitan Police at the time of its formation in 1829, which position he held until his retirement on a pension in 1865.

He was knighted by Queen Victoria at Osborne on 2 September 1858. He died at 33 Park Lane, London, 22 March 1876, and was buried in Kensal Green Cemetery on 29 March, when six of his oldest medical friends were the pallbearers. His will was proved on 22 April, the personalty being sworn under £50,000.

He was buried at Kensal Green Cemetery in London.

== Family ==
He married, first, 18 April 1829, Louisa Catherine, eldest daughter of William Haymes of Kibworth Harcourt, Leicestershire, she died in London on 5 October 1860; and secondly, 18 June 1862, Lilias Stuart, second daughter of Colonel Alexander Mackenzie of Grinnard, Ross-shire.
