= Calders & Grandidge =

Calders & Grandidge logo

Calders & Grandidge is a specialist timber manufacturing and treatment company in Boston, Lincolnshire that is the UK's largest (and main) manufacturer of wooden telegraph and (electricity) transmission posts. The company holds a Royal Warrant.

== History ==
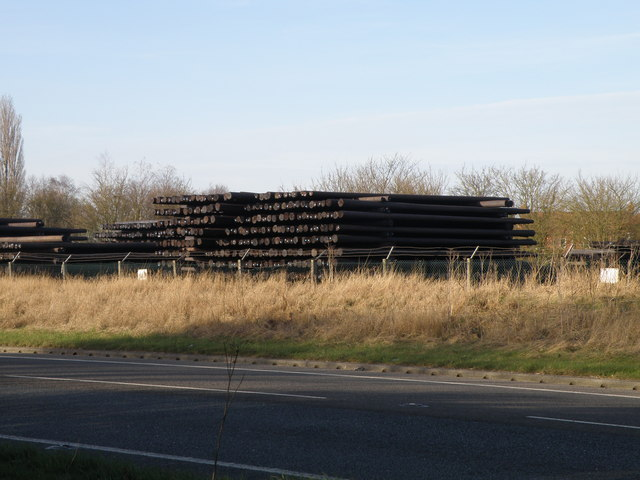
Telegraph poles in May 2009

Calders Ltd was incorporated by Sir James Charles Calder CBE (28 December 1869- 22 August 1962) of Milnathort, who was knighted in the 1921 Birthday Honours; he died in 1962 aged 92; he was Timber Controller at the Timber Supply Department of the Board of Trade from 1919–20; he was a friend of the American ambassador, Joseph P. Kennedy Sr., and his son; from 1940-41 he was Director of Home Timber Production.

A site in Boston was established in 1896 alongside Boston Dock, and moved to the 46-acre London Road site in the 1930s. Calders Ltd was incorporated on 3 February 1919 at Dunkeld in Scotland; the company was formed to acquire the business of Sir James Calder's grandfather, which was formed in 1820, and another company George Wood & Sons of Brandon, Suffolk.

It made railway sleepers for the Railway Executive (British Rail) and pit props for the Coal Mining business, by 1919 the company had also opened depots at Middlesbrough, Rotherhithe, Newcastle and Port Talbot, allowing expansion into what were the new markets, such as railway sleepers, pit props and fencing.

John MacKenzie Calder was a director in Calders Ltd but resigned in 1957 when it was taken over by Great Universal Stores. So the Calder family connection with the timber trade ended after some 140 years.

In 1945 the company took over James Grandidge Ltd, forming Calders & Grandidge on 24 March 1959. In this same year Calders and all its subsidiaries were acquired by Montague L Meyer Ltd. In 1986, the company was awarded a Royal Warrant for Preserved Timber Fencing.

In the 1980s it was a main supplier of wooden joists and rafters for house builders, known as the Calders system. It received a royal warrant in 1986.

=== Ownership ===
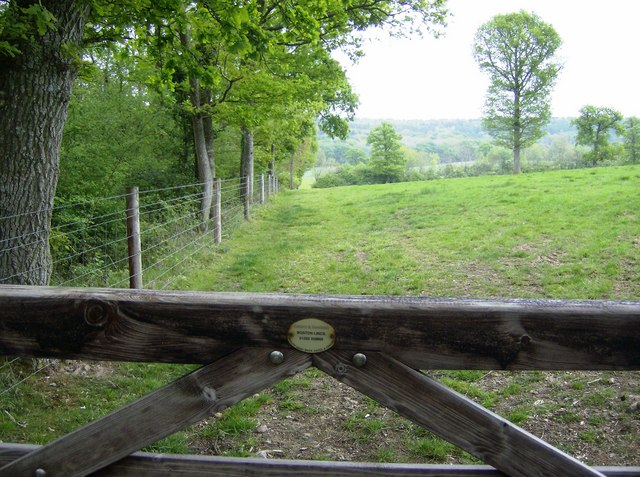
C&G gate in May 2007

On 3 May 1948, Calders Ltd was floated on the London Stock Exchange. In 1957 Calders Ltd was purchased by Great Universal Stores and then by Montague L Meyer Ltd in 1959. In 2000 Meyer International PLC was acquired by the multi-national French construction products company Saint-Gobain. In January 2023 the business was transferred to the newly incorporated Calders and Grandidge (Boston) Ltd (Reg - 12512544) which remains a subsidiary of Saint-Gobain Construction Products Ltd. In 2024 the company was sold to the Finnish company Iivari Mononen.

== Products ==
- Telegraph & transmission posts; the UK needs around 100,000 telegraph poles a year and around 120,000 electricity poles
- Fencing (pressure treated)
- Gates (wooden)
- Railway sleepers (wooden)

== See also ==
- British timber trade
- Yarnfield Park in Yarnfield in Staffordshire west of the M6 Stafford services, the former main BT training centre, which now has a training site for telegraph poles and fibre
