= 93 Park Lane =

Grade I listed terraced house in the United Kingdom

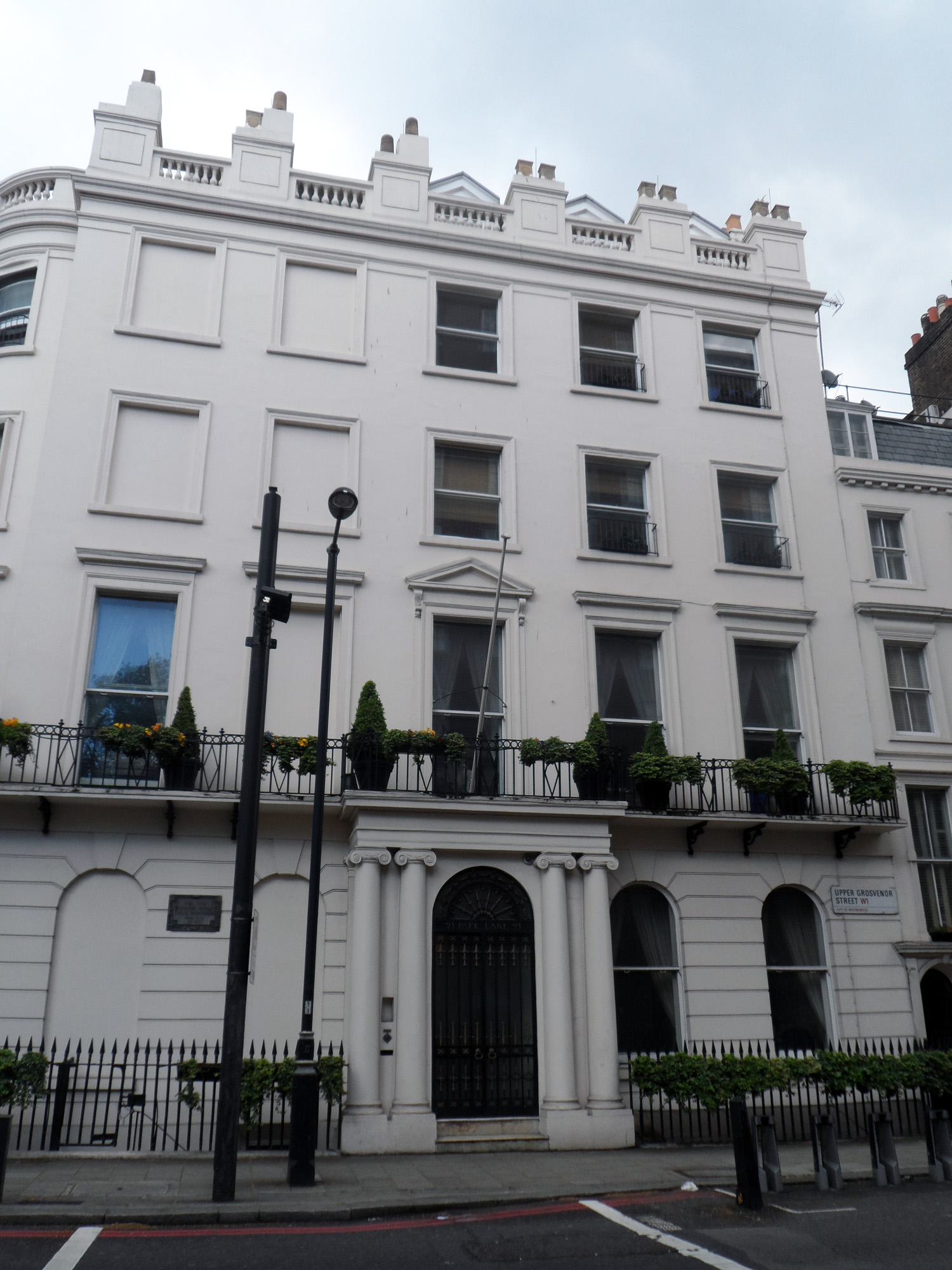
- 93 Park Lane

- Location within Central London
- 51°30′37″N 0°09′21″W

Listed Building – Grade I
- Official name: 93 Park Lane, W1
- Designated: 24 February 1958
- Reference no.: 1226023

93 Park Lane is a Grade I listed house in Park Lane, Mayfair, London W1.

It was Grade I listed in 1958.

Together with No. 94, it was rebuilt on a speculative basis in 1823–25 by Samuel Baxter, and replaced the then King's Head pub at the corner and the previous No. 24 Upper Grosvenor Street.

The new house was initially called No. 1 Grosvenor Gate, and was bought by the politician Wyndham Lewis for £14,000 in February 1827.

Lewis had married Mary Anne, daughter of John Evans, in 1816. They had no children, and he died in 1838, and left his wife a life interest in the house. In 1839, she married the future Prime Minister Benjamin Disraeli, and they lived there until her death in 1872.

Later residents include Thomas Agar-Robartes, 6th Viscount Clifden from 1889 to 1896, and Arthur Hornby Lewis, iron-master, from 1900 to 1926. The Grosvenor Estate purchased the lease in 1931, and it has been offices since 1936.
