= London Hilton on Park Lane =

Hilton-branded hotel in Westminster

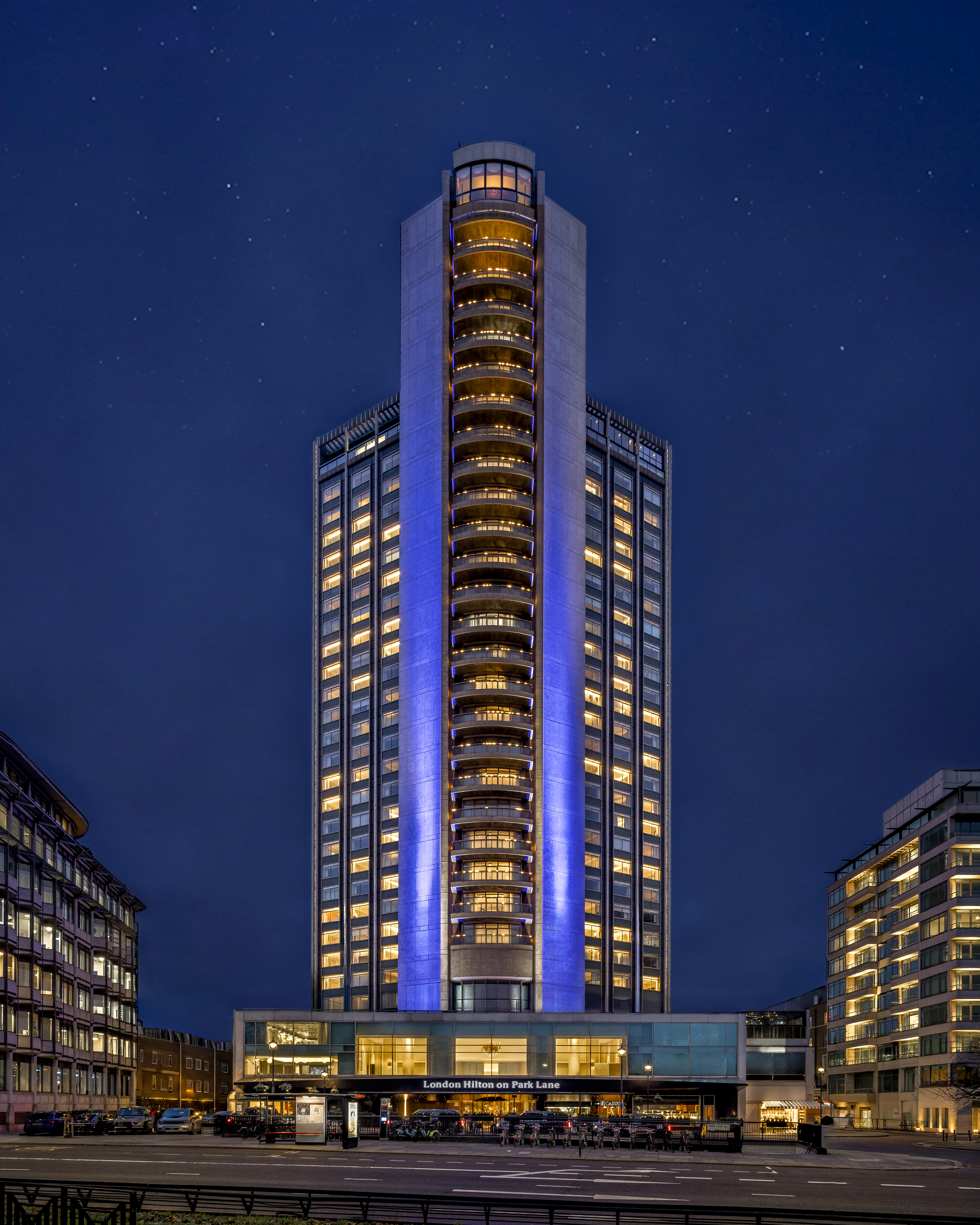
- London Hilton on Park Lane Hotel

- Location within Central London
- Hotel chain: Hilton Hotels & Resorts

General information
- Type: Hotel
- Classification: 5 stars
- Location: London, W1K 1BE; United Kingdom, 22 Park Lane
- Coordinates: 51.505512°N 0.150423°W
- Opening: 17 April 1963
- Owner: Hilton Inc.

Technical details
- Floor count: 28

Design and construction
- Architect: William B. Tabler

Other information
- Number of rooms: 453
- Number of suites: 56

Website
- Official Site

London Hilton on Park Lane is a hotel situated on Park Lane, overlooking Hyde Park, in the exclusive Mayfair district of Westminster. It is 100 metres (328 ft) tall, has 28 storeys and 453 rooms including 56 suites.

== History ==
The hotel opened as the London Hilton on 17 April 1963. It is a concrete-framed building, designed by William B. Tabler, an American architect who designed numerous Hilton hotels. The building was the first skyscraper hotel to be built in London, containing more than 500 bedrooms and six restaurants. The Park Lane Club casino is located inside the hotel.

In 1965, The London Hilton's Food and Beverage Director Lim Ewe Hin opened a James Bond themed bar due to the 1964 Goldfinger craze in London, the "007 Room". It was furnished with props brought from Pinewood Studios When it was opened Harold Sakata who played Oddjob in Goldfinger was a host to greet guest. The venue closed in the 1970s.

On 24 August 1967, the Beatles met Maharishi Mahesh Yogi at the Hilton and subsequently went to Uttar Pradesh with him in order to meditate.

On 5 September 1975, the London Hilton was the target of an IRA bomb which killed two people and injured 63 others.

During the 1990s, the Pools Panel met each Saturday in a meeting room in the hotel.

A fire broke out in the hotel on 1 July 2011. The cause was a grease build up in one of the vents in the Trader Vic's BBQ ovens. There were no fatalities or injuries, and damage was limited to water damage in Trader Vic's requiring a refurb of the soft materials. The wooden carvings were intact from this and required no repair.

The London Hilton Park Lane served as the Olympic Family Hotel during the 2012 London Olympics, hosting members of the International Olympic Committee and other dignitaries attending the 2012 Games.

The hotel is also the site of the death of the Cranberries lead singer Dolores O'Riordan on 15 January 2018, aged 46. She had drowned in her room's bathtub after drinking an excessive amount of alcohol.

In September 2018, Peter Pilotto hosted a fashion show event in Trader Vic's.

In March 2022, the London Hilton on Park Lane announced the appointment of the hotel's new general manager, Matthew Mullan, who would oversee extensive renovations and changes within the hotel.

On 28 November 2022, Trader Vic's Worldwide announced the closure of their oldest running location inside the London Hilton Park Lane. This sparked an online campaign to reverse the Hilton's decision, due to the valuable Polynesian interior that predated the hotel. The campaign was led by an online petition which received over 7,500 signatures, and an Instagram page. There was also a community Facebook group. Many celebrities became involved with the campaign, including presenter Jonathan Ross, and filmmaker Edgar Wright, who both made statements in support of keeping the restaurant open. The restaurant closed on 31 December 2022 with no comment from the Hilton regarding the campaign.

In April 2023, the hotel closed the WYLD nightclub at the site formerly known as Drama Park Lane and Whisky Mist.

In July 2023, it was announced that Paramount and Channel 5 had commissioned Inside the Hilton on Park Lane, a docuseries featuring exclusive access to the hotel. Produced by Wonderhood Studios, the 4 x 60-minute series would go behind the scenes at the hotel as it underwent a multi-million-pound renovation. It was screened on Channel 5 from 7 to 28 April 2024.

On 28 April 2024, the London Hilton on Park Lane closed the Galvin at Windows restaurant.

In June 2024, the Entourage Group announced that it will open its first UK branch of the Mr Porter steakhouse brand at the London Hilton on Park Lane. Originating from a restaurant in Amsterdam, Mr Porter has expanded from its initial location at Amsterdam's W Hotel to its first London site. The new venue will replace the Old Trader Vic's at the Hilton, and will feature a main bar, wine library, chef's table, and open kitchen. However, due to delays it is planned to open in 2025.

In June 2024, it was announced that Shanghai Me, a restaurant with locations in Dubai and Doha, would take over the rooftop restaurant and bar space at the hotel, following the closure of the Galvin Brothers' restaurant after an 18-year tenure. The new restaurant will feature a 1930s Shanghai design and a Pan-Asian menu, including dishes like lobster with Singapore sauce, sushi platters, Cantonese roast duck, and Mongolian lamb chops. Shanghai Me is known for high-end offerings such as roast duck with foie gras and caviar, and a Wagyu sub.

On 27 September 2024, after an Environmental Health Officer from Westminster City Council visited the site they gave hotel a zero out of five food hygiene rating requiring urgent improvement necessary from the London Hilton on Park Lane hotel.

In September 2024, the Executive Head Chef, Anthony Marshall, retired after a 34-year tenure at the London Hilton on Park Lane.

In October 2024, London Hilton on Park Lane names director of food and drink, venues and partnership, Julian Catzeflis, to help launch the third party food and drink concepts in the hotel. In a press release Julian says 'I am thrilled to join such a legendary hotel at one of the most exciting points in its history,' he says. 'London Hilton on Park Lane is about to become the city's most exciting food destination, and I am very much looking forward to working with the team as this new era unfolds.'

In May 2025, London Hilton on Park Lane announced the appointment of their new Executive Head Chef, Nicolas Smalberger.

In November 2025, London Hilton on Park Lane announced the appointment of James Clarke as its new general manager. He succeeds former general manager Mathew Mullan, who spent four years overseeing a major refurbishment of the hotel, which included the closure of several venues within the property; Galvin at Windows, 10 Degrees bar, Trader Vic’s, and the Wyld by Nature nightclub. Stephen Cassidy, senior vice-president for Hilton UK & Ireland, paid tribute to Mullan's significant contribution in leading the hotel’s, noting that he leaves a lasting mark on the property.

== Popular culture ==
The London Hilton on Park Lane, known as the London Hilton when first built, was regarded as a modern landmark of its era and was prominently referenced in popular culture during that time.

The London Hilton - and especially its ″jutting balconies″ are repeatedly referred to in J.G. Ballard's 1970 novel The Atrocity Exhibition. According to Ballard's own commentary, this was because "Elizabeth Taylor was staying at the Hilton during the shooting of Cleopatra, when she contracted pneumonia and was given a tracheotomy. The Hilton's balconies reminded Travis of the actress's lost gill-slits (which we all develop embryonically as we briefly recapitulate our biological past)."

In the 1974 novel The Forever War by Joe Haldeman, the main character, William Mandella, takes a leisure cruise in a "dirigible", a floating hotel which crosses the Atlantic Ocean in three days and docks atop the London Hilton.

In 1978 Warren Zevon released the song Werewolves of London mentioned the Trader Vic's bar which was located in the basement of the hotel. The songs lyric was "I saw a werewolf drinkin' a piña colada at Trader Vic's, And his hair was perfect". For fans of Warren Zevon this made this bar a popular place to go to and drink a piña colada.

The hotel is mentioned in Only Fools and Horses, in the episode titled "A Royal Flush", which was the Christmas special of 1986. In this episode, Del Boy attempts to integrate Rodney into high society after Rodney starts dating a young woman named Vicky, whose family is quite wealthy. During one of the scenes, Del Boy makes a reference to staying at the London Hilton, trying to impress Vicky's aristocratic family and fit into their world of affluence.

The Crown used Trader Vic's as a backdrop for one of the destinations of the fictional Prince Charles during one of his international scenes. The scene was ultimately cut from the series.

The post-credits scene in Spider-Man: No Way Home of Eddie Brock drinking in a bar was filmed in the Trader Vic's, a bar which was located in the hotel's basement.

== Incidents ==
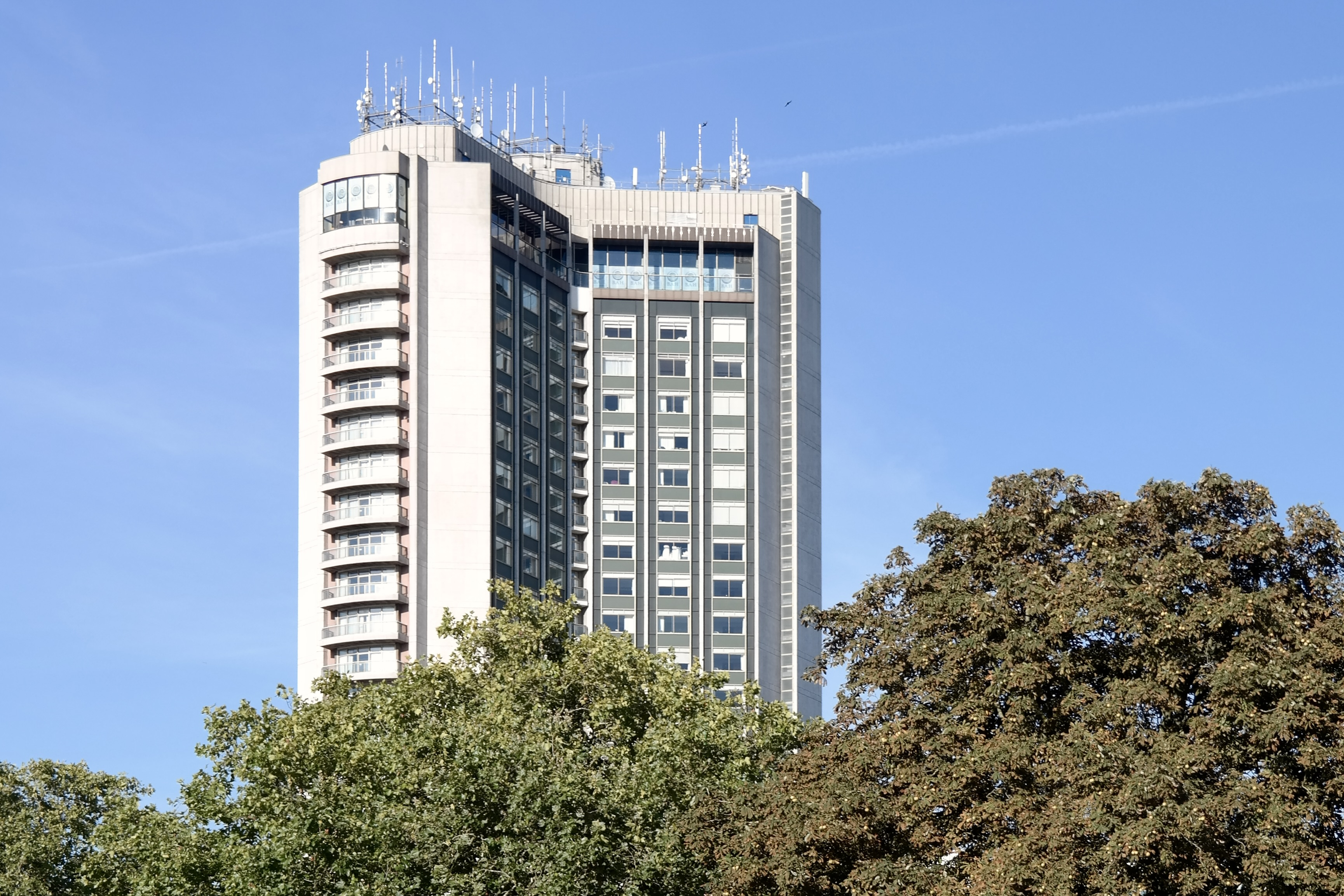
Upper floors of the hotel (2024)

Due to its height and prominent areas, tT In October 1992, Darren Newton died from a failed BASE jumping attempt from the top of the London Hilton on Park Lane.

In September 2000, Alastair Morris was found dead on the pavement, having jumped from the 25th floor.

In September 2001, Ajay Goyal, a director of a cosmetics company, jumped to his death from the 14th floor of the hotel.

After the Goyal incident, Hilton said that it had "permanently" locked all bedroom balcony doors. A spokesman said this week: "Security is of utmost importance to Hilton. All windows can only be opened by five inches, and balconies can only be opened if there is more than one registered guest in the room."

In September 2002, Jason Kiernan, suffering from psychological illness, jumped to his death from the 25th floor. His suicide note was found outside his room.

On 21 September 2007, a man in his 20s fell to his death from the 19th floor after a three-hour standoff with police negotiators. Emergency services responded to reports of the man standing on a ledge early in the morning, after the man had broken a window to gain access to the ledge. Despite efforts by negotiators to prevent the fall, the man landed on the roof of a second-floor building and was pronounced dead shortly afterward. Police did not disclose the man's identity or details regarding the circumstances leading to his fall.

In April 2012, Darren Liddle, a Credit Suisse employee, died by suicide from the 19th floor due to work-related stress and substance abuse issues.

In March 2014, an unidentified man fell from the 28th floor. Despite efforts, police were unable to identify him, though his Oyster card suggested connections to South London.

In January 2018, the Cranberries singer Dolores O'Riordan was found dead in her room after accidental drowning brought on by intoxication.

== See also ==
- London Hilton bombing
- Hotels in London
- Tall buildings in London
