= Park Lane =

Road in London

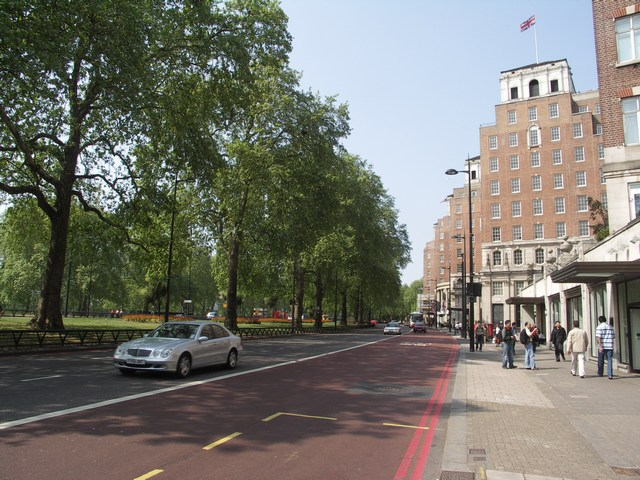
- Looking north on Park Lane. Hyde Park is to the left; the Grosvenor House Hotel to the right.

- Location within City of Westminster
- Former name: Tyburn Lane
- Part of: A4202
- Namesake: Hyde Park, London
- Maintained by: Transport for London
- Length: 0.7 mi (1.1 km)
- Location: City of Westminster, Central London
- Postal code: W1
- Nearest Tube station: Hyde Park Corner; Marble Arch
- Coordinates: 51.508888°N 0.155129°W

Construction
- Inauguration: 1741

Other
- Known for: The Dorchester; Grosvenor House Hotel; London Hilton on Park Lane; InterContinental London Park Lane; Londonderry House; Marriott London Park Lane; Park Lane Hotel; Park Lane Mews Hotel; Somerset House

Park Lane is a dual carriageway road in the City of Westminster in Central London. It is part of the London Inner Ring Road and runs from Hyde Park Corner in the south to Marble Arch in the north. It separates Hyde Park to the west from Mayfair to the east. The road has a number of historically important properties and hotels and has been one of the most sought after addresses in London, despite being a major traffic thoroughfare.

The road was originally a simple country lane on the boundary of Hyde Park, separated by a brick wall. Aristocratic properties appeared during the late 18th century, including Breadalbane House, Somerset House, and Londonderry House. The road grew in popularity during the 19th century after improvements to Hyde Park Corner and more affordable views of the park, which attracted the nouveau riche to the street and led to it becoming one of the most fashionable roads to live on in London. Notable residents included the 1st Duke of Westminster's residence at Grosvenor House, the Dukes of Somerset at Somerset House, and the British prime minister Benjamin Disraeli at No. 93. Other historic properties include Dorchester House, Brook House and Dudley House. In the 20th century, Park Lane became well known for its luxury hotels, particularly The Dorchester, completed in 1931, which became closely associated with eminent writers and international film stars. Flats and shops began appearing on the road, including penthouse flats. Several buildings suffered damage during World War II, yet the road still attracted significant development, including the Park Lane Hotel and the London Hilton on Park Lane, and several sports car garages. A number of properties on the road today are owned by some of the wealthiest businessmen from the Middle East and Asia. Past and current residents include the business mogul Mohamed Al-Fayed and former council leader and Lord Mayor Shirley Porter.

The road has suffered from traffic congestion since the mid-19th century. Various road enlargement schemes have taken place since then, including a major reconstruction programme in the early 1960s that transformed the road into a three-lane dual carriageway by removing a 20-acre (8.1 ha) section of Hyde Park. Improved crossings for cyclists appeared in the early 21st century. Despite the changes, property prices along the road are still among the highest in London. Its prestigious status has been commemorated by being the second-most expensive property square on the London Monopoly board.

== Location ==
Park Lane is about 0.7 miles (1.1 km) long, and runs north from Hyde Park Corner to Marble Arch, along the eastern flank of Hyde Park. To its east is Mayfair. The road is a primary route, classified A4202.

The street is one of the key bus corridors in Central London. It is used by London bus routes 2, 6, 13, 16, 23, 36, 74, 137, 148, 390 and night bus routes N2, N16, N74 and N137. The nearest tube stations are Hyde Park Corner on the Piccadilly line near the street's southern end and Marble Arch on the Central line near its northern end. At Brook Gate, partway along the road, there is a traffic signal controlled pedestrian and cycle crossing connecting Hyde Park to London Cycle Route 39, the recommended cycling route from the park to the West End.

== History ==
=== 18th century ===
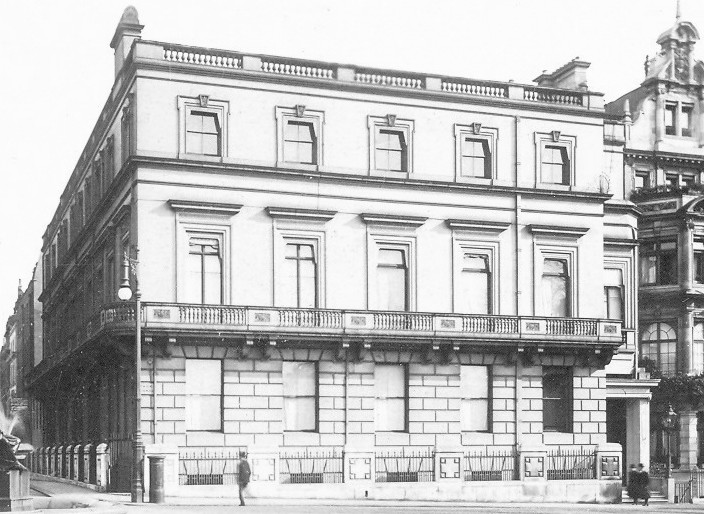
Londonderry House, 19 Park Lane, c. 1900

What is now Park Lane was originally a track running along farm boundaries. When Hyde Park was opened in the 16th century, the lane ran north–south along its eastern boundary from Piccadilly to Marble Arch.

In the 18th century, it was known as Tyburn Lane and was separated from the park by a high wall with few properties along it, aside from a short terrace of houses approximately where Nos. 93–99 are now. Tyburn Lane took its name from the former Tyburn, a village which had declined in the 14th century. At the end of what is now Park Lane was the Tyburn gallows (also known as Tyburn Tree), London's primary public place of execution until 1783. Author Charles Knight wrote in 1843, that by 1738 "nearly the whole space between Piccadilly and Oxford Street was covered with buildings as far as Tyburn Lane, except in the south-western corner about Berkeley Square and Mayfair".

In 1741, the Kensington Turnpike Trust took over its maintenance, as coach traffic caused wear on the road surface. Breadalbane House was built on the street in 1776. On the corner with Oxford Street, Somerset House (No. 40), built in 1769–70, was successively the town house of Warren Hastings, a former Governor-General of India, the third Earl of Rosebery, and the Dukes of Somerset. The politician and entrepreneur Richard Sharp, also known as "Conversation Sharp", lived at No. 28. (Note: House numbers have changed twice in Park Lane; first in 1872, then in 1934)

In the 1760s, Londonderry House, on the corner of Park Lane and Hertford Street, was bought by the Sixth Earl of Holdernesse. He purchased the adjacent property and converted the buildings into one mansion known for a period as Holdernesse House. In 1819, Londonderry House was bought by The Rt. Hon. The 1st Baron Stewart, a British aristocrat, and later, during World War I, the house was used as a military hospital. After the war, Charles Vane-Tempest-Stewart, Viscount Castlereagh, and his wife, Edith Helen Chaplin, continued to use the house and entertained there extensively. After World War II, the house remained in the possession of the Londonderry family, until it was sold to make way for the 29-storey London Hilton, which opened on Park Lane in 1963.

=== 19th century ===
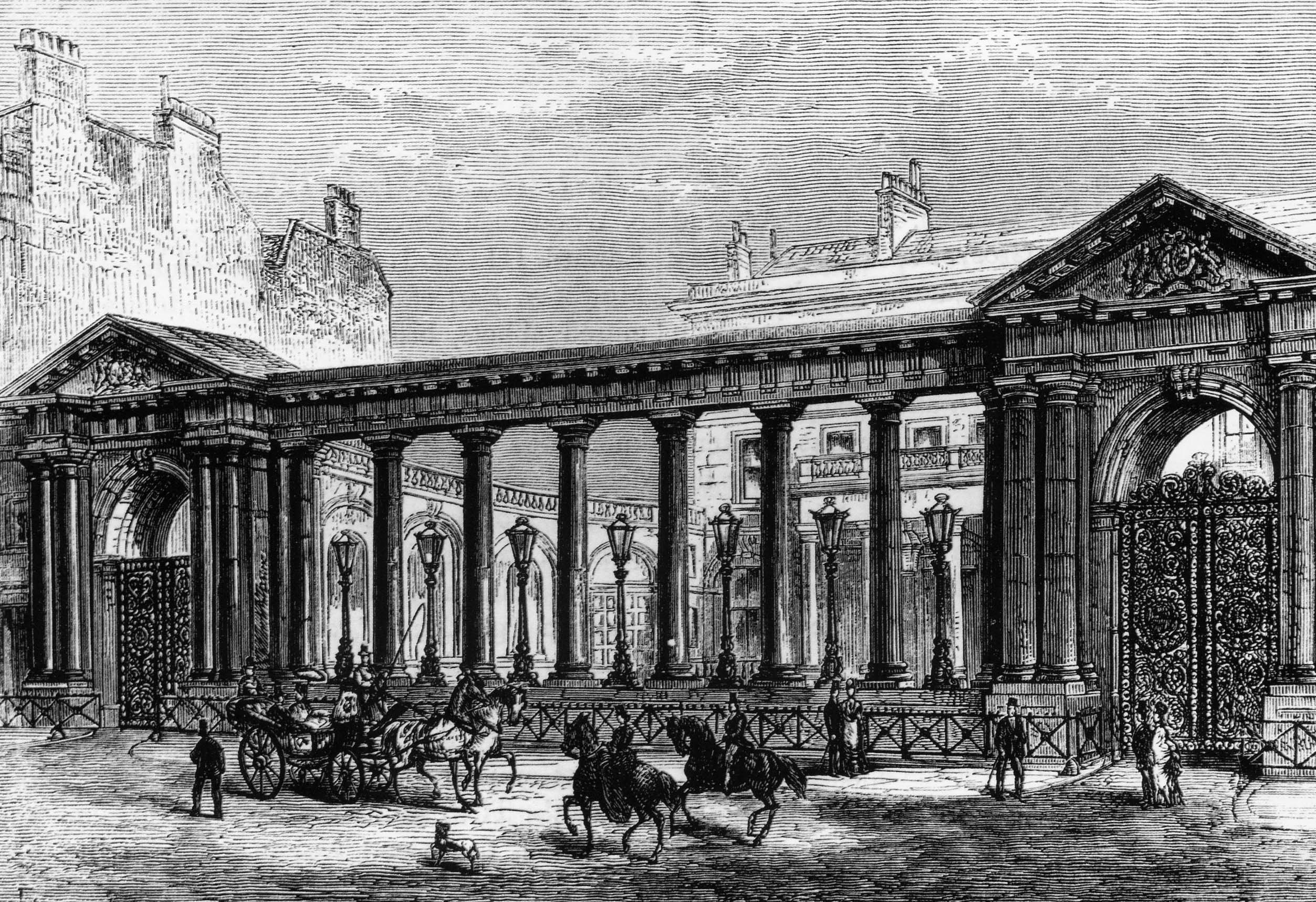
The facade to Grosvenor House viewed from Park Lane in the early 19th century. The Grosvenor House Hotel now occupies this location.

The street was not particularly significant until 1820, when Decimus Burton constructed Hyde Park Corner at the lane's southern end, coinciding with Benjamin Dean Wyatt's reconstruction of Londonderry House and Apsley House. At the same time, the entrances to Hyde Park at Stanhope, Grosvenor, and Cumberland Gates were refurbished, and the park's boundary wall was replaced with iron railings. Park Lane subsequently became an in-demand residential address, offering views across Hyde Park and a position at the most fashionable western edge of London. No. 93, at the junction of Park Lane and Upper Grosvenor Street, was built between 1823 and 1825 by Samuel Baxter. The British prime minister Benjamin Disraeli lived at the house from 1839 to 1872. In 1845, a house on Park Lane was advertised as "one of the most recherché in London".

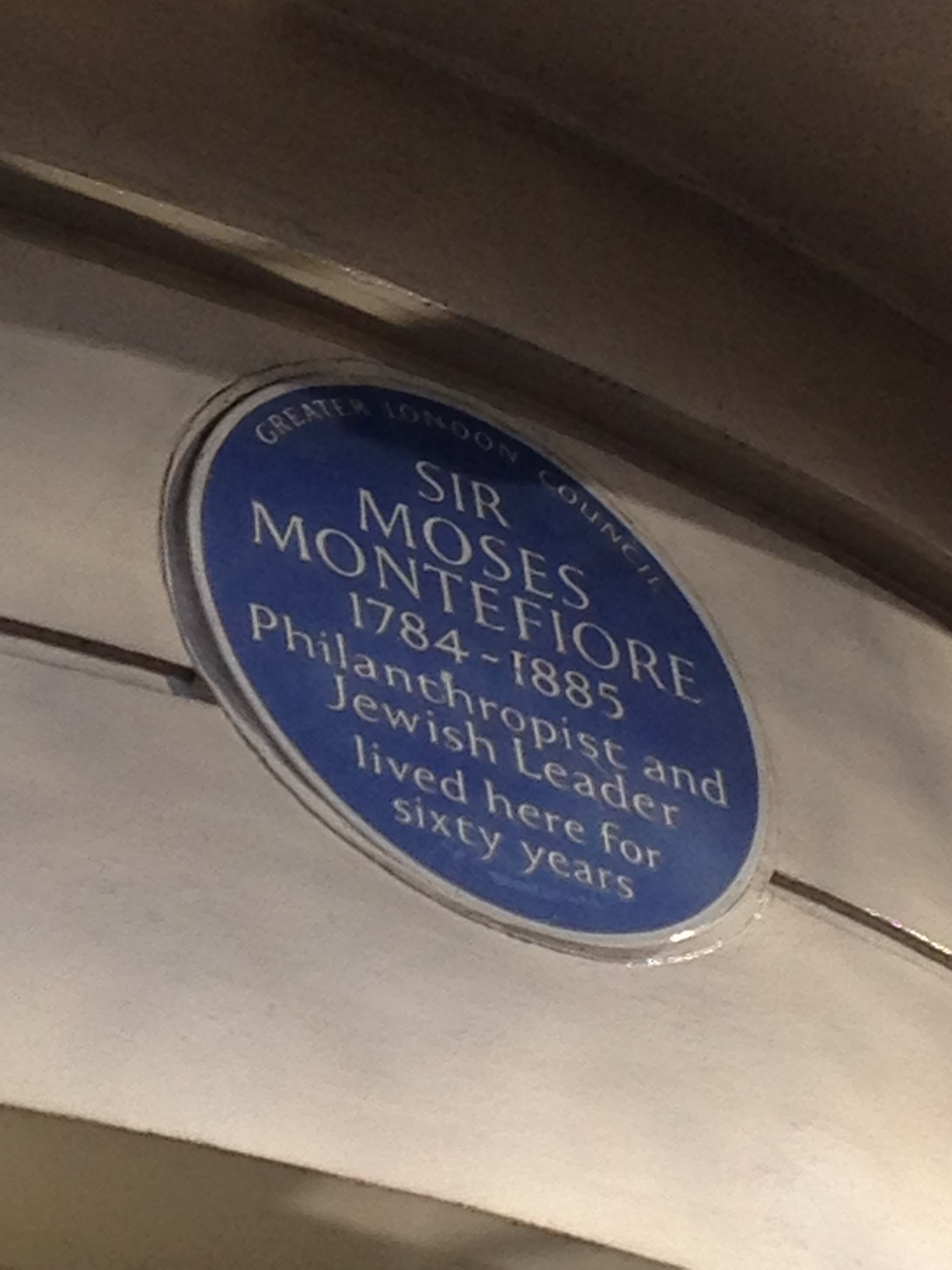
A blue plaque at 90 Park Lane, marking the residence of Moses Montefiore, who lived there for over 60 years

Much of the land to the east of Park Lane was owned by the Grosvenor Estate, whose policy was to construct large family homes attracting the nouveau riche to the area. The road became lined with some of the largest privately owned mansions in London, including the Duke of Westminster's Grosvenor House (replaced by the Grosvenor House Hotel) and the Holford family's Dorchester House (demolished in 1929 and replaced in 1931 with The Dorchester) and the Marquess of Londonderry's Londonderry House. The philanthropist Moses Montefiore lived at No. 90 for over 60 years, and a blue plaque marks its location.

Brook House, at No. 113 Park Lane, was built in 1870 by T. H. Wyatt. It later became the residence of Lord Louis Mountbatten and his wife Edwina. Aldford House was constructed in 1897 for the South African diamond millionaire Sir Alfred Beit. Another diamond mining magnate, Sir Joseph Robinson owned and lived at Dudley House at No. 100.

=== 20th century ===
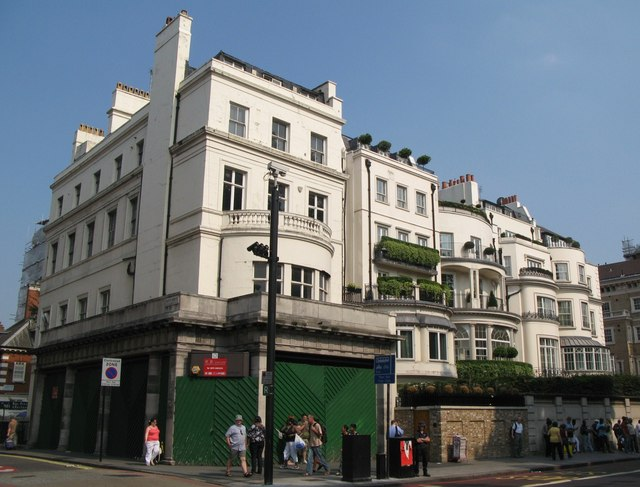
Buildings at the north end of Park Lane

The character of Park Lane evolved from its prestigious reputation in the early 20th century, as residents began to complain about motor traffic and the noise from buses. The first flats were built at Nos. 139–140 in 1915 despite local opposition, with shops following soon afterwards. However, buildings were redeveloped to allow penthouse flats, which became popular. The politician and art collector Philip Sassoon lived at No. 25 in the 1920s and 1930s and held an extensive collection of objects at his house. Dancing partners Fred and Adele Astaire moved into a penthouse flat at No. 41 in 1923, and stayed there during their theatrical appearances at London's West End. The couple were courted by the social scene in London and enjoyed dancing at Grosvenor House. American film star Douglas Fairbanks Jr. resided at No. 99 when working in England in the 1930s. The black market fraudster Sidney Stanley lived on Park Lane in the 1940s, and became known as "the Pole of Park Lane".

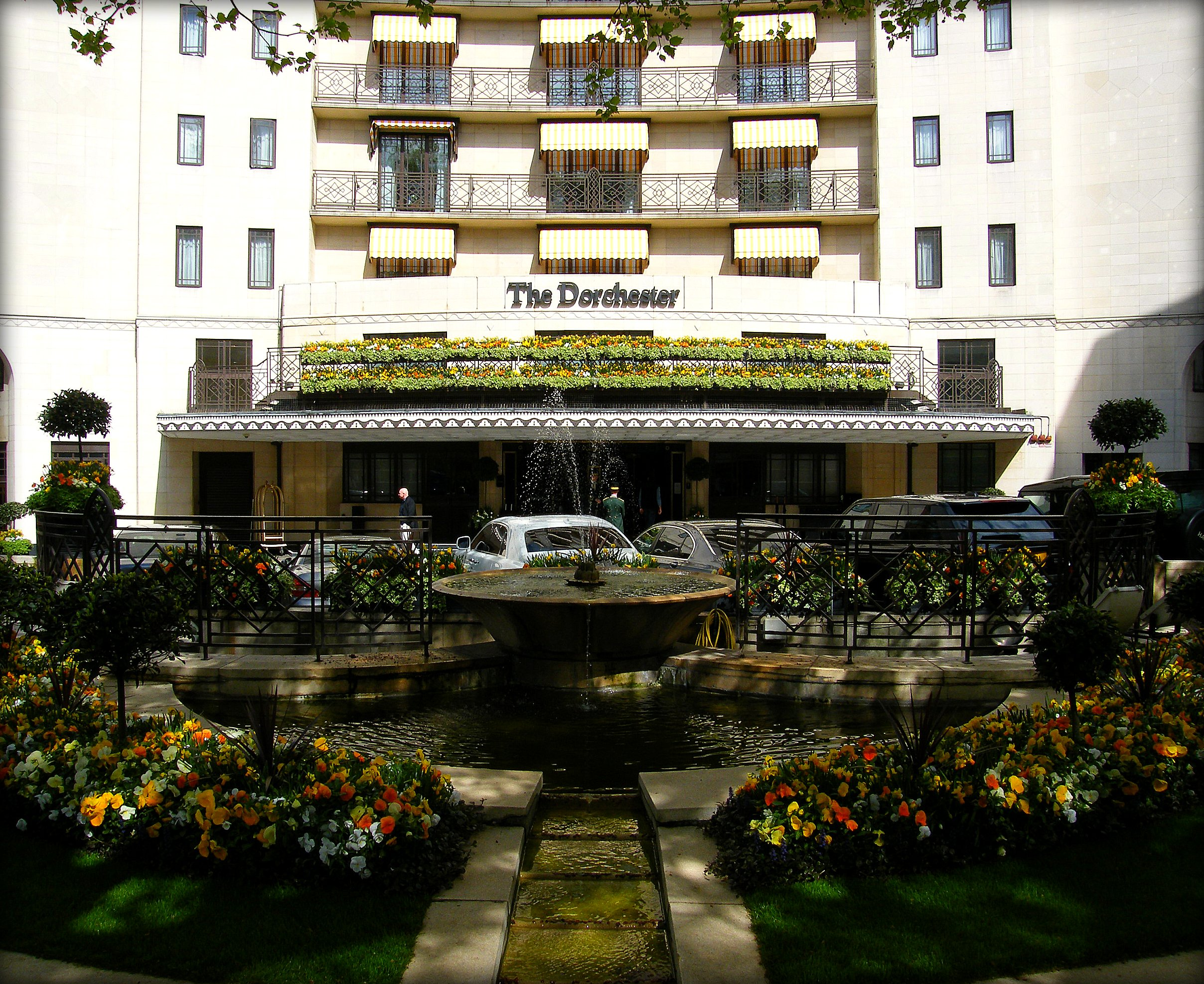
The Dorchester opened in 1931 and retains its Art Deco style.

The Marriott London Park Lane, at No. 140 Park Lane, opened in 1919. The site was once occupied by Somerset House and Camelford House. The site also includes No. 138 Park Lane, which was featured as a Home Guard headquarters in the film The Life and Death of Colonel Blimp. The Park Lane Hotel was built in 1927, designed by the architects Adie, Button and Partners. Despite its name, its postal address is on Piccadilly and it overlooks Green Park rather than Hyde Park.

Grosvenor House, designed by Sir Edwin Lutyens opened in 1929 included both serviced apartments and hotel rooms. It was followed by The Dorchester, by Sir Owen Williams, in 1931. With the development of these hotels, concerns were raised that Park Lane would soon become New York City's Fifth Avenue. Grosvenor House and The Dorchester quickly gained reputations as destination hotels for hosting Society balls and parties.

During the 1930s the Dorchester became known as a haunt of numerous writers and artists, such as poet Cecil Day-Lewis, novelist Somerset Maugham, and painter Sir Alfred Munnings. From World War II onwards, the hotel and Park Lane became renowned for accommodating numerous international film stars, and it was closely associated with Elizabeth Taylor and Richard Burton in the 1960s and 1970s.

During World War II, several properties on Park Lane were hit by bombs. Dudley House, at No. 100, suffered major structural damage, including the destruction of the ballroom and gallery, though the building was partially restored. However, the strength of construction of the Dorchester Hotel gave it the reputation of being one of London's safest buildings, and it was a safe haven for numerous luminaries. General Dwight D. Eisenhower took a suite on the first floor in 1942, and later made it his headquarters.

The British Iron and Steel Research Association, an institution responsible for much of the automation of modern steelmaking, was originally established at No. 11 Park Lane in June 1944. It has since moved to No. 24 Buckingham Gate. The contact lens pioneer Keith Clifford Hall held a practice at No. 139, later expanding to No 140, from 1945 to 1964. The site of his practice is now commemorated by a green heritage plaque. The film and stage actress Anna Neagle lived at Alford House on Park Lane between 1950 and 1964 with her husband Herbert Wilcox; the location of which is now marked with a green heritage plaque. The hotel trade continued to prosper; construction of the London Hilton on Park Lane at 22 Park Lane began in 1960 and opened in 1963 at a construction cost of £8m (now £146,000,000). On 5 September 1975, a Provisional IRA bomb exploded at the hotel, killing two people and injuring over 60. The blast also damaged neighbouring properties.

At the south end of Park Lane, on the west side, gates in honour of Queen Elizabeth The Queen Mother (widow of George VI) were erected in 1993. The gates were designed by Giuseppe Lund and David Wynne and bear motifs in an interpretation of her coat of arms.

=== 21st century ===
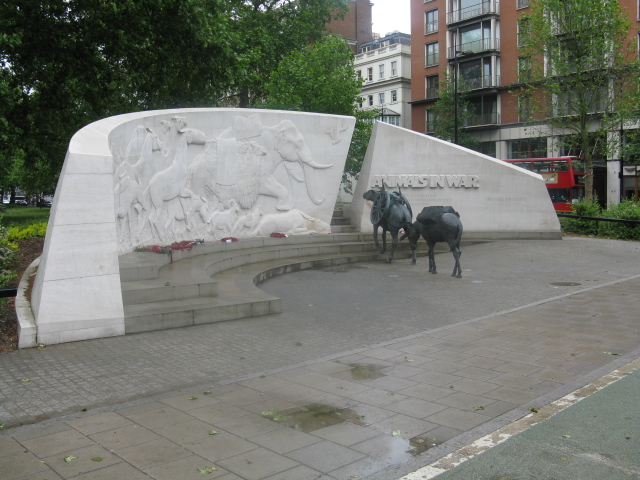
The Animals in War Memorial was erected at the northeast side of Park Lane in 2004.

The Animals in War Memorial was opened at the northeast edge of Park Lane in 2004 by Anne, Princess Royal. It commemorates animals that served in wars, and alongside servicemen. In June 2007, a car bomb was successfully defused in an underground car park on Park Lane. The road was closed for most of the day for police investigation.

The road still attracts notable residents. In 2002, Robert B. Sherman, composer of the musicals Chitty Chitty Bang Bang and Mary Poppins, moved to an apartment on Park Lane following the death of his wife. He enjoyed the views of Hyde Park and in 2003 painted an eponymous portrait, Park Lane. The business mogul Mohamed Al-Fayed had offices in 55 and 60 Park Lane. Trevor Rees-Jones, the only survivor of the car crash that killed al-Fayed's son Dodi Fayed and Diana, Princess of Wales in 1997, briefly recuperated in a flat on Park Lane following the accident.

Property prices on Park Lane remain some of the highest in London. In 2006, former Conservative leader of Westminster City Council, Dame Shirley Porter moved into a new £1.5m development on Curzon Square after twelve years of exile in Israel. In 2015, a report showed the average monthly rent for a 2-bedroom apartment on the road was £5,200. Rough sleepers also made use of the road's surroundings from at least 2012, with large begging gangs or other homeless groups sleeping in subways or covered shopping parades despite occasionally being cleared or moved on by police.

Many of the hotels and establishments on Park Lane are today owned by some of the wealthiest Middle Eastern and Asian businessmen, sheikhs and sultans. The Dorchester was purchased by the Sultan of Brunei in 1985, and since 1996 has been part of the Dorchester Collection, owned by the Brunei Investment Agency (BIA), an arm of the Ministry of Finance of Brunei. The Dorchester Collection connects The Dorchester on Park Lane to other luxury hotels internationally, including The Beverly Hills Hotel and Hotel Bel-Air of Los Angeles, and the Hôtel Meurice of Paris. In 1978, a new branch of the Allied Arab Bank opened at 131–2 Park Lane, facilitating the interests of both Arab world and western clients. Mamasino restaurant at 102 Park Lane serves African cuisine and is African-owned. Wolfgang Puck's restaurant at No. 45 has been described by GQ Magazine as serving one of the best breakfasts in London, with a mixture of American, European and Asian food.

== Traffic ==
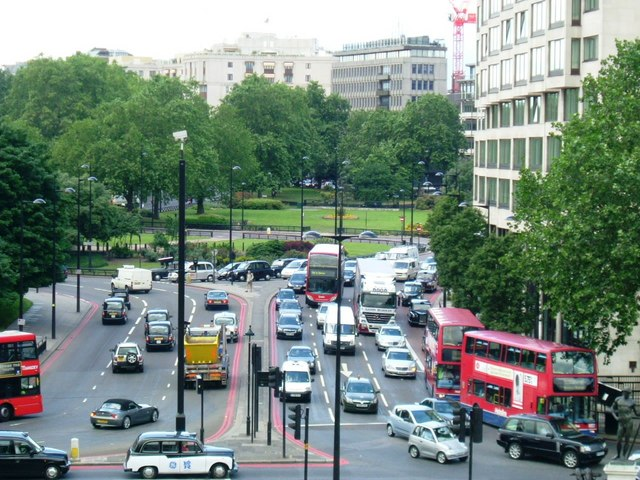
Park Lane was remodelled between 1960 and 1963, including re-routing traffic closer to Apsley House.

Owing to property on the road becoming more desirable, traffic began to increase on Park Lane during the 19th century. A short section of the lane was widened in 1851 as part of the redevelopment work on Marble Arch. In July 1866, following the destruction of the boundary railings after a demonstration supporting the Second Reform Bill, the road was widened as far as Stanhope Gate. In 1871, Hamilton Place was widened to allow an alternative traffic flow to Piccadilly.

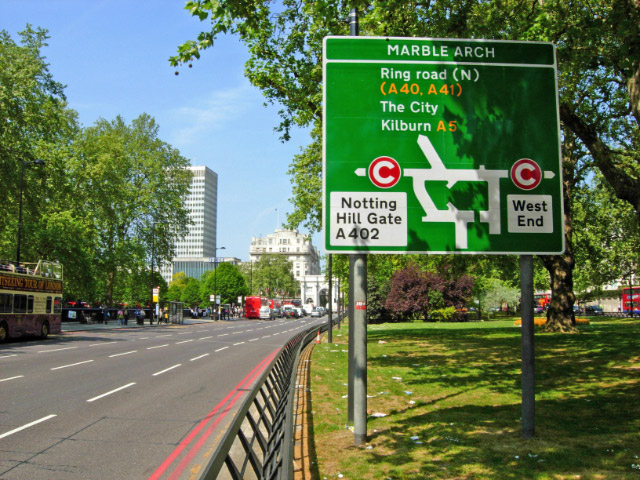
Park Lane in 2007, when the road was a free through route through the London congestion charge zone

Park Lane Improvement Act 1958 (Note: Section 26.)
- Act of Parliament
- Parliament of the United Kingdom
- Long title: An Act to authorise the London County Council to carry out certain street improvements in the vicinity of Park Lane partly on lands comprised in Hyde Park and the Green Park and partly on other lands; and for purposes connected therewith.
- Citation: 6 & 7 Eliz. 2. c. 63
- Territorial extent: United Kingdom

Dates
- Royal assent: 1 August 1958
- Commencement: 1 August 1958 (Note: The Acts of Parliament (Commencement) Act 1793.)
Other legislation
| Amended by | Crown Estate Act 1961 |

Status: Amended

Text of statute as originally enacted

By the 1950s, motor traffic levels along Park Lane had reached saturation point. A 1956 survey by the Metropolitan Police reported "at peak hours it is overloaded", with traffic surveys showing 91,000 and 65,000 vehicles travelling around Hyde Park Corner and Marble Arch respectively in a twelve-hour period, making Park Lane the link between the busiest and third busiest road junctions in London.

Between 1960 and 1963, the road was widened to three lanes each way either side of a central reservation. This required the demolition of Nos. 145–148 Piccadilly, near Hyde Park Corner, which had previously formed a line east of Apsley House. The work also re-appropriated East Carriage Drive inside Hyde Park as the northbound carriageway, moving the park's boundary westwards. Additionally, a car park was installed under the road, which became the largest underground parking area in London. Despite the claims to preserve as much of the park as possible during the widening works; around 20 acres (8.1 ha) of park was removed and around 95 trees were felled. At the time of opening, the project was the largest road widening scheme in Central London since the construction of Kingsway in 1905. The total estimated cost was £1,152,000 (now £21,040,000).

The east side of Park Lane, from Curzon Street to Achilles Way, was the site of the first bus lane in the UK. While it came into operation, 4 p.m. on 26 February 1968, at the same time as the one on Vauxhall Bridge, its traffic order was the first. Further traffic signals were installed at the junction of Park Lane and Hyde Park corner in 1983.

The road forms part of the London Inner Ring Road and is part of the London congestion charge zone's boundary. When the zone was extended westward in February 2007, Park Lane was designated as one of the "free through routes", on which vehicles could cross the zone during its hours of operation without paying the charge. The western extension was removed in January 2011.

In November 2008, the mayor of London, Boris Johnson announced plans to build a tunnel beneath the street, allowing land to be released for development and green spaces. The traffic improvements and remodelling have diminished the appeal of Park Lane as a residential address since it became one of the busiest and noisiest roads in central London. In 2011, Johnson introduced spot fines for coaches idling on Park Lane. The widening of the road distanced the houses on the east side of Park Lane from Hyde Park itself, access to which is now by underpass. Despite the traffic noise the road is still upmarket, featuring five-star hotels (such as The Dorchester, the JW Marriott Grosvenor House Hotel and the InterContinental London Park Lane Hotel) and showrooms for several sports car models, including BMW, Aston Martin and Mercedes-Benz.

During the Covid-19 pandemic, some of the lanes for normal motor traffic on the northbound side were converted into a bidirectional cycle lane and a bus lane. Initially this left only one lane for normal motor traffic for the most part of the road, although later an additional general traffic lane was added at the northern section. Although installed initially as a temporary measure, the arrangement has now been made permanent. Coach parking on the same side has also been added more recently, which had initially been removed for the temporary arrangements.

== Cultural references ==
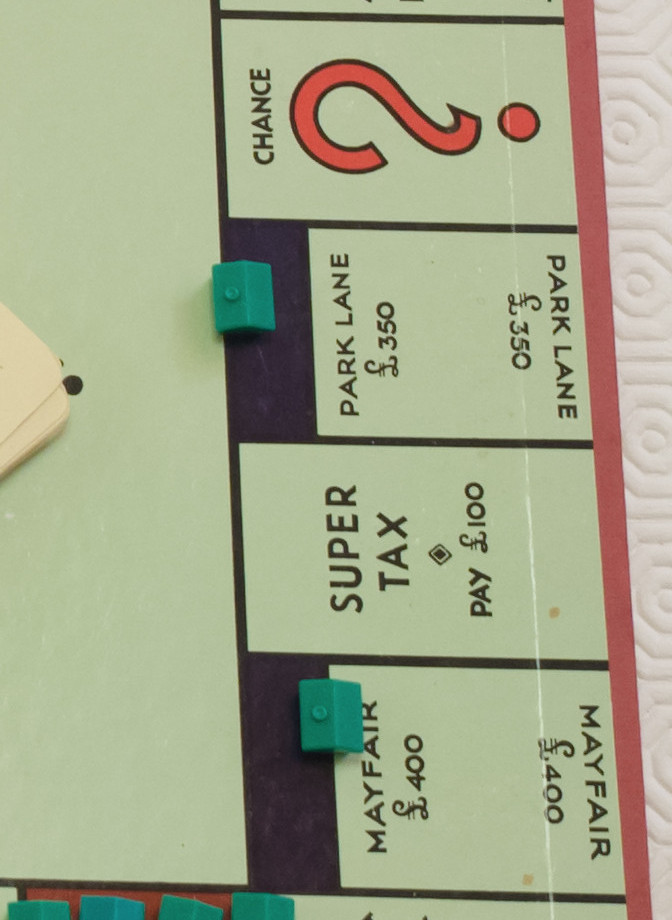
On a British Monopoly board, Park Lane is the second most expensive property square, after Mayfair.

Park Lane is the second most valuable property in the London edition of the board game Monopoly. The street had a prestigious social status when the British version of the Monopoly board was first produced, in 1936. On the board, Park Lane forms a pair with Mayfair, the most expensive property in the game. The squares were designed to be equivalents of Park Place and Boardwalk, respectively, on the original board, which used streets in Atlantic City, New Jersey. In 1988, the World Monopoly Championships were held at the Park Lane Hotel, sponsored by Waddingtons, manufacturers of the British version. Since the game's original production, prices on the real Park Lane have held their value, though average rent costs have been overtaken by Bond Street.

In Arthur Conan Doyle's short story "The Adventure of the Empty House" (1903), Sherlock Holmes investigates and solves a locked-room murder which took place at No. 427 Park Lane (the old numbering), and which is referred to as the "Park Lane Mystery". The story is set in 1894. The writer Jasper Fforde refers to the street and its Monopoly square in his novel The Eyre Affair (2001), via the character Landen Parke-Laine. (Note: Readers of Fforde's novels have claimed the character is a bowlderisation of either "land on (as in playing Monopoly) Park Lane" or "London, Park Lane")

The street has several mentions in John Galsworthy's 1922 trilogy, The Forsyte Saga. The 1967 BBC television adaptation used Croxteth Hall in Liverpool for footage of James and Emily's house on Park Lane. The road is mentioned in the second stanza of Noël Coward's patriotic song "London Pride".

In George Orwell's Coming Up for Air (1939) several conservative and imperialist politicians are derogatively referred to as "the Park Lane riff-raff".

The Mini Countryman Park Lane is a high-end four wheel drive sport utility vehicle named after the road, where the company has a showroom. In Walter Lord's book A Night to Remember, which documents the fate of the RMS Titanic, a broad, lower-deck working corridor on E Deck, which ran the length of the ship, was referred to by officers as "Park Lane" (and by crew as "Scotland Road").

== Bibliography ==
- Binder, Georges (2006). Tall Buildings of Europe, Middle East & Africa. Images Publishing. ISBN 978-1-876907-81-5.
- Colby, Reginald (1967). Mayfair: a town within London. A. S. Barnes.
- Fleming, N. C. (22 July 2005). The Marquess of Londonderry. I. B.Tauris. ISBN 978-1-85043-726-0.
- Fodor's (12 August 2014). Fodor's London 2015. Fodor's Travel Publications. ISBN 978-0-8041-4259-5.
- Hibbert, Christopher; Weinreb, Ben (2008). The London Encyclopedia. Pan MacMillan. ISBN 978-1-405-04924-5.
- Hodgson (1962). Industrial Research in Britain. F. Hodgson.
- Knapman, David (2003). Conversation Sharp: The Biography of a London Gentleman Richard Sharp (1759–1835) in Letters, Prose and Verse. Dorset Press.
- Knight, Charles (1843). London. C. Knight & Company.
- Moore, Tim (2003). Do Not Pass Go. Vintage. ISBN 978-0-099-43386-6.
- Murphy, Robert (2 September 2003). Realism and Tinsel: Cinema and Society in Britain 1939–48. Routledge. ISBN 978-1-134-90150-0.
- O'Loughlin, John Vianney (1 January 1996). Social Polarization in Post-industrial Metropolises. Walter de Gruyter. ISBN 978-3-11-013728-6.
- Rennison, Nick (2007). London. Canongate. ISBN 978-1-84195-934-4.
- Richardson, Bruce (1 January 1997). The Great Tea Rooms of Britain. BENJAMIN PRESS. ISBN 978-1-889937-09-0.
- Riley, Kathleen (1 February 2012). The Astaires: Fred & Adele. Oxford University Press. ISBN 978-0-19-991307-7.
- Russell, Iain F. (1 April 1988). Sir Robert McAlpine and Sons: The Early Years. CRC Press LLC. ISBN 978-1-85070-191-0.
- Stafford, David (2 September 2010). Ten Days To D-Day: Countdown to the Liberation of Europe. Little, Brown Book Group. ISBN 978-0-7481-2229-5.
- Sutcliffe, Anthony (2006). London: An Architectural History. Yale University Press. ISBN 978-0-300-11006-7.
- Watson, Victor (2008). The Waddingtons Story: From the early days to Monopoly, the Maxwell bids and into the next. Jeremy Mills Publishing. ISBN 978-1-906-60036-5.
- Weightman, Gavin; Humphries, Stephen (2007). The Making of Modern London. Ebury Press. p. 113. ISBN 978-0-09-192004-3.
- Wharton, Annabel Jane (2001). Building the Cold War: Hilton International Hotels and Modern Architecture. University of Chicago Press. ISBN 978-0-226-89419-5.
- Wheeler, Thomas Bruce (27 September 2011). The London of Sherlock Holmes. Andrews UK Limited. ISBN 978-1-78092-211-9.
