= OYB =

OYB or oyb may refer to:

- Oyster Bay station, a proposed MTR station in Siu Ho Wan, Hong Kong
- oyb, the ISO 639-3 code for Oy language, Laos
