= Rambler Channel railway bridge =

Bridge in New Territories, Hong Kong

Rambler Channel Bridge / Tsing Lai Bridge
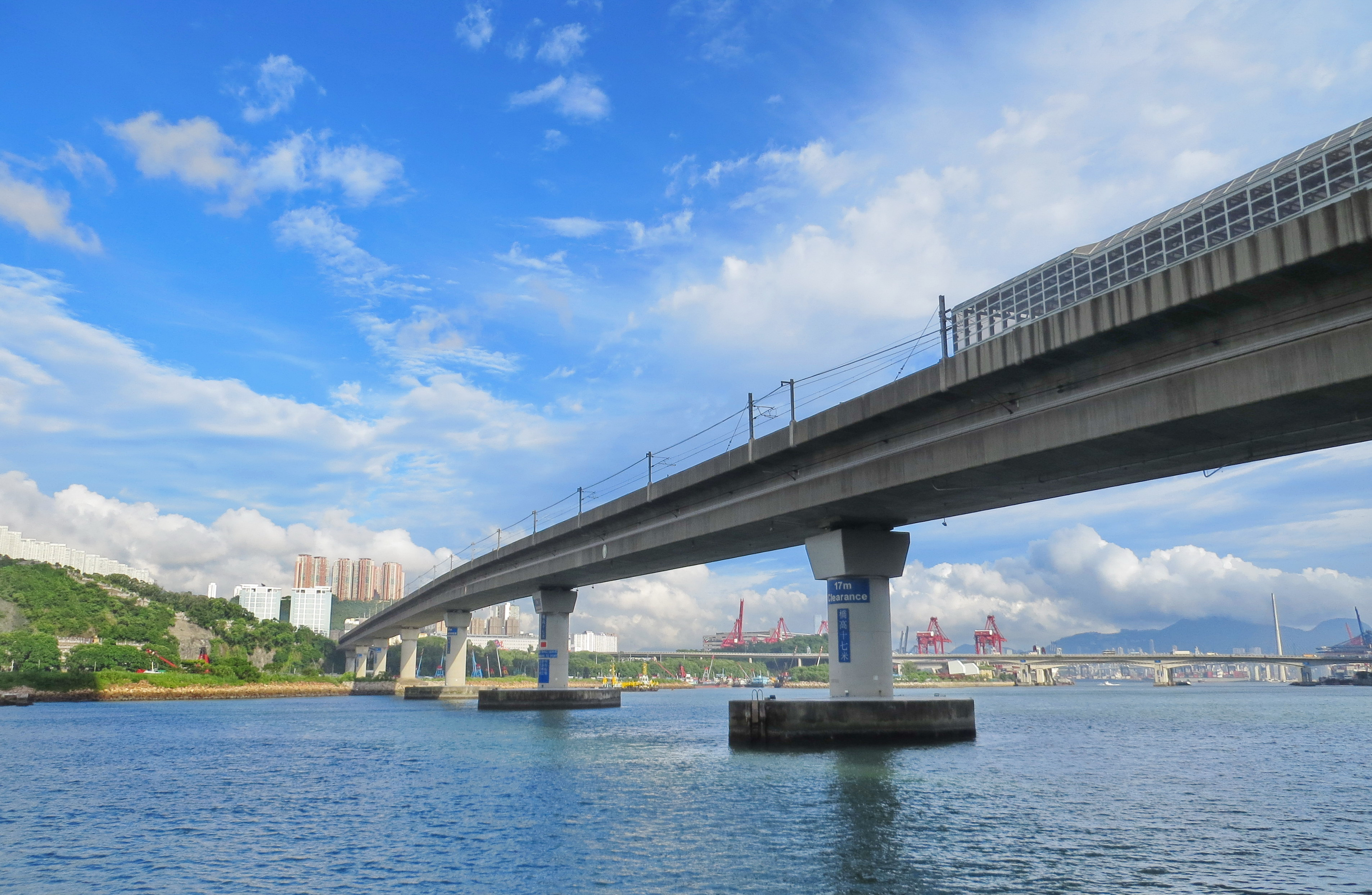
- Tsing Lai Bridge viewed from Tsing Yi
- Coordinates: 22°21′25″N 114°06′45″E
- Carries: Tung Chung line Airport Express
- Crosses: Rambler Channel
- Locale: Kwai Chung, Hong Kong

Characteristics
- Material: Concrete
- Total length: 1,100 m (3,600 ft)

History
- Designer: Bouygues Travaux Publics
- Constructed by: Dragages Hong Kong-Penta-Ocean Construction JV
- Construction start: October 1995; 30 years ago
- Construction end: February 1997; 29 years ago
- Construction cost: $490 million
- Opened: 21 June 1998; 28 years ago

Location
- Interactive map of Rambler Channel Bridge / Tsing Lai Bridge

The Rambler Channel Bridge, also known as Tsing Lai Bridge, is a quadruple-track railway bridge in Hong Kong. It carries the MTR's Airport Express and Tung Chung line over the Rambler Channel, linking Tsing Yi station and Lai King station.

== History ==
In 1994, the Mass Transit Railway Corporation awarded the contract to design and construct the bridge to Dragages et Travaux Publics, in partnership with Penta-Ocean Construction. The contract was worth $490 million. The bridge was designed by Bouygues Travaux Publics. Construction began in October 1995. It was structurally completed in February 1997. The bridge began carrying revenue passengers with the opening of the Tung Chung line on 21 June 1998.

=== 1996 construction accident ===
Six construction workers were killed when a metal work platform collapsed on 6 June 1996. The platform, which held four men, plunged 20 metres and crushed two workers below. The men were rushed to Yan Chai Hospital in nearby Tsuen Wan and declared dead shortly after arrival at 6:00 pm.

Those killed were engineer Tam Wai-shing, 40; Yeung Sung-po, 50; Shek Shing, 58; Wong Kam-wo, 30; and brothers-in-law Law Tai-yau, 36, and Cheng Chi-ming, 33.

The Labour Department launched an investigation to determine the cause of the accident. It was aided by specialists from the Electrical and Mechanical Services Department and the Buildings Department. Construction of the bridge was temporarily halted and the Labour Department inspected all similar work platforms across the territory.

The tragedy was blamed on the wrong type of bolt being used to affix the work platform to a concrete pillar. A Coroner's Court inquest before coroner David Thomas heard that the anchor bolts were only half the length required, were designed to hold electric cables, and were screwed into plastic sockets. The platform collapsed after two of the bolts detached. The weight on the platform exceeded four tonnes (4.4 short tons), or three times more than the bolts could support.

On 4 December 1996, the Labour Department issued summonses to Dragages et Travaux Publics; its manager, Didier Noel; and subcontractor Takamura Limited (which built the platform), under charges of breaching general duties provisions under the Factory and Industrial Undertakings Ordinance. Dragages was accused of not providing sufficient training to workers, and failing to ensure the safety of the platform. A representative for Takamura argued against prosecuting the company as it was only responsible for installing the platform.

Dragages et Travaux Publics was found solely responsible for the collapse. The company was fined HK$105,000 on 8 August 1997 after admitting to three charges of failing to ensure safety and failing to maintain properly built scaffolding. In October 1997 Takamura Limited (also known as Pacific Island Consultants) was cleared of responsibility for the accident.

The tragedy was the single greatest loss of life during the Airport Core Programme.

== Description ==
The bridge is 1,100 metres (3,600 ft) long. It is made up of precast concrete segments lowered into place by a launching gantry. The bilevel main deck segments are eight metres (26 ft) high and weigh 120 tonnes (130 short tons) each. The segments are held together with epoxy glue and high-strength steel tendons.
