= Siu Ho Wan =

Former bay of Hong Kong

Coordinates: 22.3128°N 113.9971°E

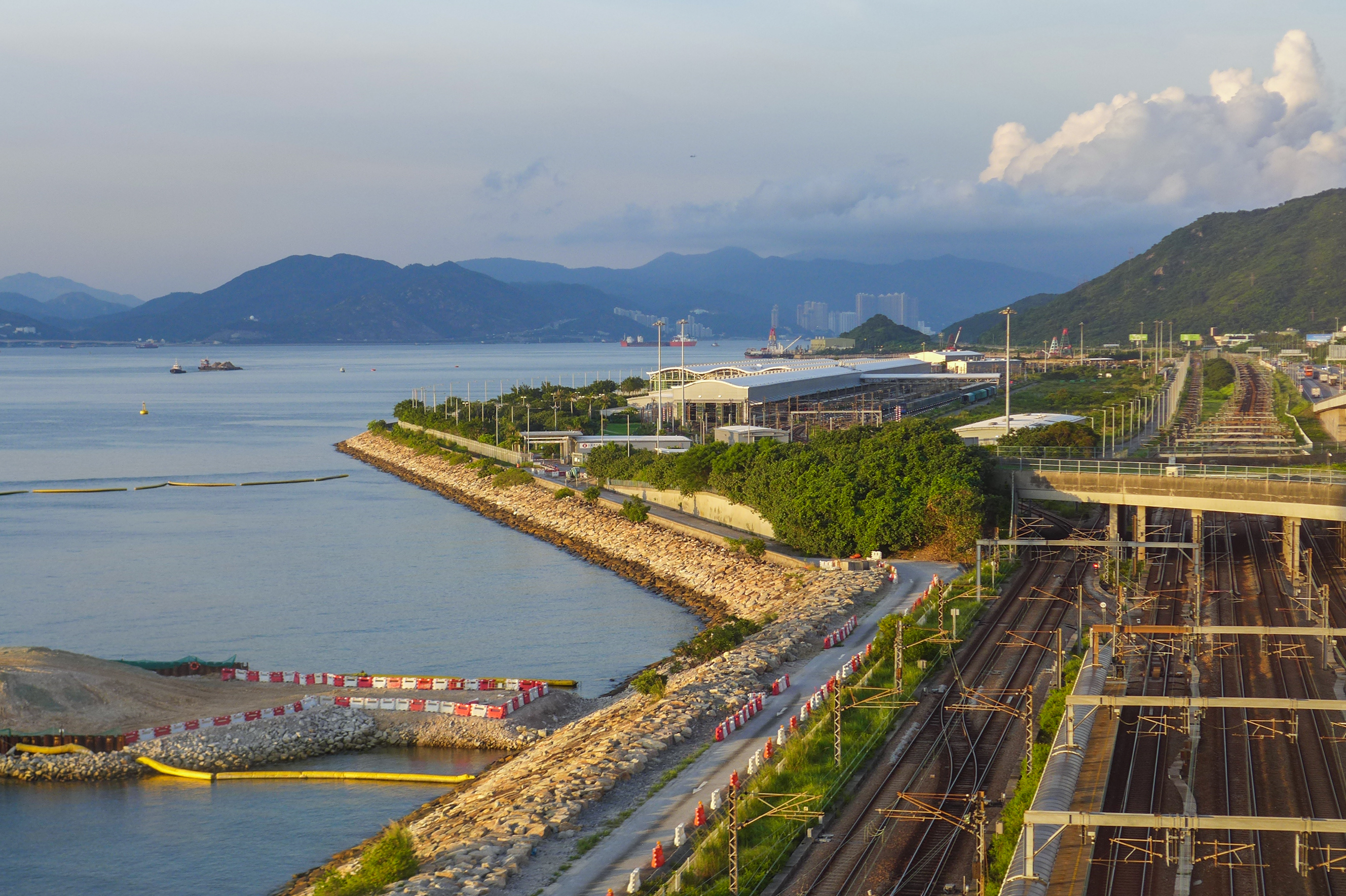
Siu Ho Wan.

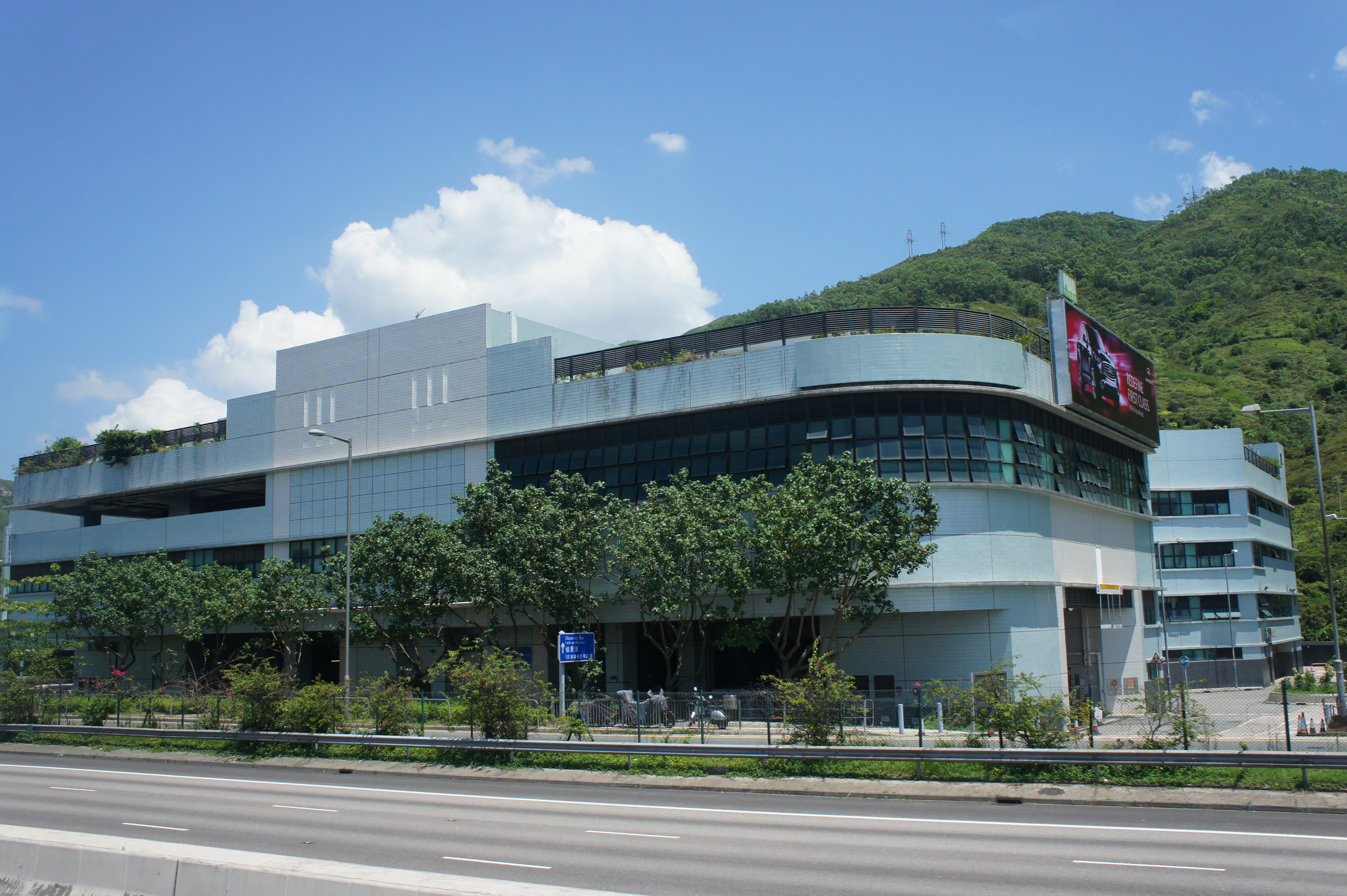
Siu Ho Wan Government Maintenance Depot (Hong Kong)

Siu Ho Wan (Chinese: 小蠔灣; lit. 'small oyster bay', also 小濠灣; 'small inlet bay') is a bay on the north shore of Lantau Island in Hong Kong. The bay has been largely reclaimed for bus depots. The Airport Express, Tung Chung line of the MTR and the North Lantau Highway run across the reclamation of the bay. The Siu Ho Wan MTR depot lies on the reclaimed shore between Ngau Kok Wan and is currently used by Airport Express, Tung Chung line and Disneyland Resort line.

== History ==
In the 1990s, the Hong Kong Government reclaimed the bay in order to construct links to the new Chek Lap Kok airport and the new town of Tung Chung, including the North Lantau Highway, Airport Express and Tung Chung line. The government also built a depot for rolling stock used on MTR lines. The highway was completed in 1997, and the MTR lines in 1998 (in time for the opening of the new airport).

Soon afterwards, the government constructed a new tunnel link from Siu Ho Wan to Discovery Bay, which was opened on 27 May 2000 and is known as the Discovery Bay Tunnel.

== Access ==
- New Lantao Bus No. 36 Tung Chung (Tat Tung Road) - Siu Ho Wan (three scheduled buses daily)

== See also ==
- Oyster Bay station (MTR)
