= Tung Chung East station =

Future MTR station in the New Territories, Hong Kong

Tung Chung East 東涌東
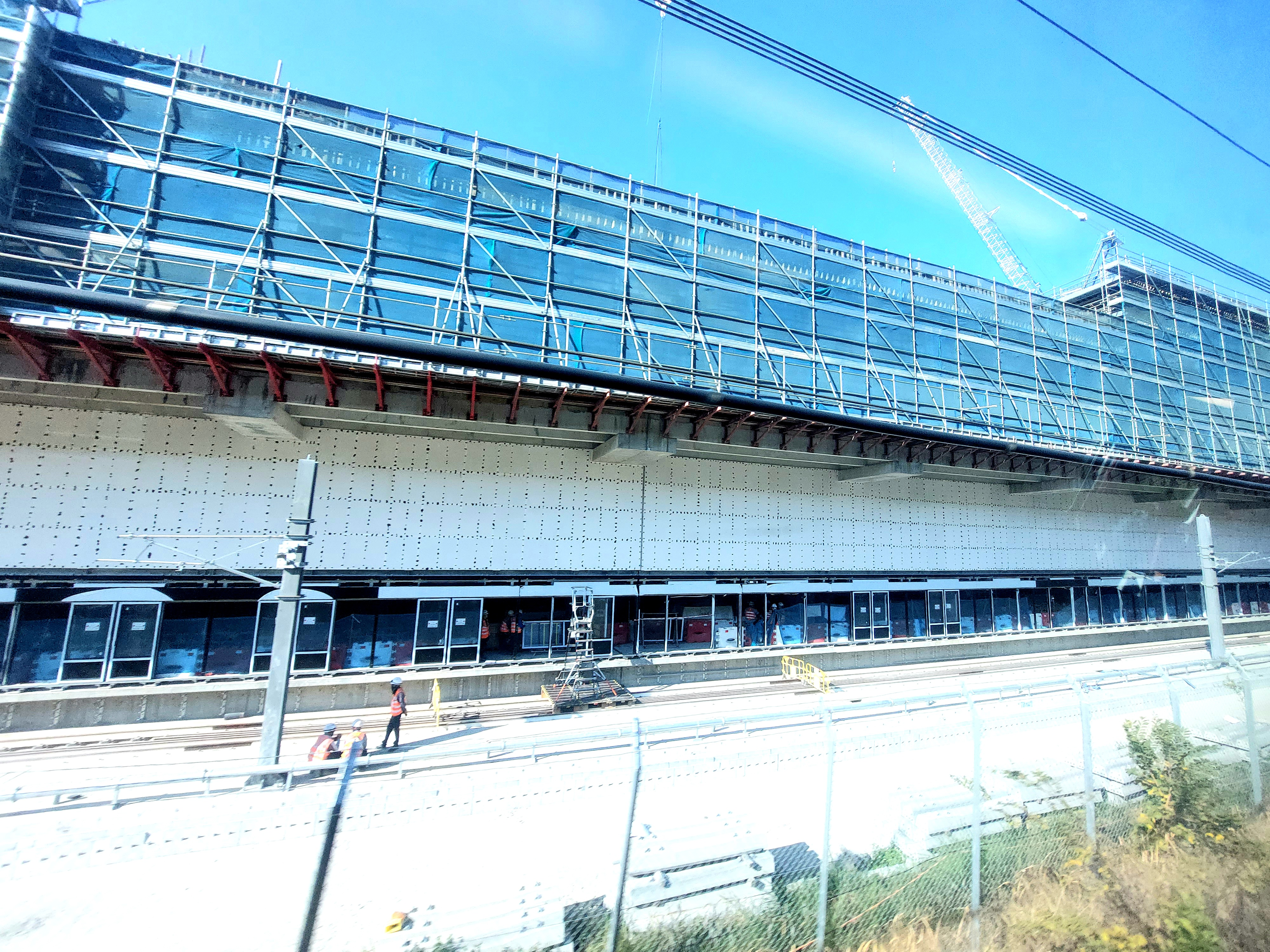
- Tung Chung East Station. January 2026

Chinese name
- Traditional Chinese: 東涌東
- Simplified Chinese: 东涌东
- Cantonese Yale: Dūngchūng dūng
- Literal meaning: East of the East (of a) branch of a river
Transcriptions
Standard Mandarin
- Hanyu Pinyin: Dōngchōng dōng
Yue: Cantonese
- Yale Romanization: Dūngchūng dūng
- Jyutping: Dung1cung1 dung1

General information
- Location: Unnamed Road, Tung Chung; Islands District, Hong Kong
- Coordinates: 22°17′48″N 113°57′29″E
- Elevation: Ground Level
- System: Future MTR rapid transit station (Under construction began 2023)
- Owner: MTR Corporation
- Operator: MTR Corporation
- Line: Tung Chung line
- Platforms: 2
- Connections: None

Construction
- Structure type: At-grade
- Platform levels: 1

Other information
- Station code: TCE
- Website: Tung Chung Line Extension

History
- Opening: Expected: December 2029; 3 years' time

Key dates
- 2020: Planning and design commences
- 2021: Project gazetted under the Railways Ordinance (amendments in 2022)
- 2022: Environmental permit approved
- 25 May 2023: Commencement of construction
- December 2029: Expected completion of construction

Services
Preceding station	MTR	Following station
Proposed
Oyster Bay towards Tamar	Tung Chung line Tung Chung line extension	Tung Chung towards Tung Chung West
Location
- Location within MTR

Tung Chung East (Chinese: 東涌東) is an MTR station currently under construction on the Tung Chung line situated in the east of Tung Chung, Lantau Island, New Territories, Hong Kong. It is built on reclaimed land, and east of Ying Tung Estate. The station is expected to be completed and open for service in December 2029.

It was one of two new railway stations proposed in the Tung Chung New Town Extension Study, to serve a proposed new 120 ha (1.2 km^{2}; 300 acres) area of reclaimed land, along with a new Tung Chung West station. The proposal was approved by the government in 2023.

The Tung Chung East station will be constructed at ground level, similar to Sunny Bay, to not affect the existing railway network.

As of May 2023, the plan is to have two exits on the at-grade concourse.
