= John Lloyd (graphic designer) =

British graphic designer, born 1944

John David Lloyd (born 1944) is a British graphic designer, who in 1975 co-founded the international design consultancy Lloyd Northover. He has worked in all fields of graphic design but has specialised in corporate identity.

== Summary ==
John David Lloyd started his design career in 1960, as an apprentice lithographic artist in the printing industry. As an apprentice, he attended the London School of Printing and Graphic Arts (LSPGA) as a part-time student from 1960 to 1964. He began full-time study in 1964, first at Walthamstow School of Art / South West Essex School of Art, and in 1965 at the London College of Printing. On graduating with first class honours in 1968, he joined Allied International Designers in London, leaving in 1975 to co-found the design consultancy, Lloyd Northover, with designer, Jim Northover. He has been a teacher and examiner at the London College of Printing (now the London College of Communication), an examiner at Nottingham Trent University, and a D&AD jury member.

He was Chairman of the British Design Export Group from 1983 to 1985. With Jim Northover, he has received the Grand Prix in the International Design Effectiveness Awards, and the International Gold Award at the New York Art Directors Club. He has spoken at conferences in Europe, North America and Asia. Lloyd is currently an independent artist, and writer.

== Selected major projects ==
Selected corporate identity programmes completed at Allied International Designers:

- Meneba, The Netherlands 1968
- Nicholas International, UK 1969
- Euromast, The Netherlands 1969
- Priba Supermarkets, Belgium 1973 (Designed in collaboration with Geoff Gibbons)
- ABN Bank, The Netherlands 1970s
- Philips, The Netherlands 1970s

Selected corporate identity programmes completed at Lloyd Northover:

- BAA (British Airports) 1986
- Courtaulds, UK 1989
- John Lewis Partnership, UK 1990
- Nuclear Electric, UK 1989/1990
- British Medical Association, UK 1995
- University of Essex, UK 1996
- BNFL, UK 1996
- Financial Services Authority, UK 1997
- Partek, Finland 1998
- Valmet, Sweden 1998
- Tractebel, Belgium 1998
- Airport Express, Hong Kong 1999
- NS&I (National Savings & Investments), UK 2005
- Rockwater, UK 1988

Other graphic design projects completed for:

- American Express, Arts Council of Great Britain, BP Chemicals, English Tourist Board, IBM, Letraset, Millennium Commission, National Trust, Reuters, Royal Shakespeare Company, Sainsbury's.

== Lloyd Northover (design consultancy) ==
=== Origins ===
The Lloyd/Northover creative partnership has been enduring. John Lloyd met Jim Northover in 1965 at the London College of Printing where they were studying for the Diploma in Art and Design (DipAD Graphic Design). They soon began to work together and their earliest collaborative work – posters for the LCP Film Society, Whitechapel Gallery and University of London Arts Festival – were designed at the LCP in the 1960s.

=== Early years 1975–1980 ===
The Lloyd Northover design consultancy (Lloyd Northover Limited) was formally launched in 1975. Early clients included the English Tourist Board, Royal Shakespeare Company, Arts Council, American Express, and IBM. In 1981 the Design Council invited Lloyd Northover to mount an exhibition of their work at the Design Centre in London and the Scottish Design Centre in Glasgow.

=== Steady growth 1981–1990 ===
By the mid-1980s, the emphasis of the consultancy's work had shifted from print design to the design and implementation of substantial corporate identity programmes. Key projects from those years are BAA (British Airports), John Lewis Partnership, and Courtaulds, which broke new ground and was awarded the Grand Prix in the first Design Effectiveness Awards in 1989.

=== International expansion 1991–2000 ===
==== Asia Pacific ====
In 1993 Lloyd Northover won a commission to create an identity for Hong Kong's Airport Express. The consultancy provided naming, and the design of graphics, liveries, interiors, signage, and passenger information. Lloyd Northover's Hong Kong office went on to serve the wider transport sector in the Asia Pacific region.

==== Europe and the Middle East ====
During this period, the London office grew substantially whilst in Continental Europe corporate identity assignments were tackled in Finland, Sweden, Germany, Belgium and Switzerland; an office was also opened in Dubai. Lloyd Northover joined the Citigate Communications Group in 1993, which later became part of Incepta Group plc, an international marketing and services group.

==== USA ====
Shortly after the death of the eminent American graphic designer, Saul Bass, in 1996, Lloyd and Northover, who were long-term admirers of his work, were offered, and accepted, the opportunity to merge their consultancy with Bass Yager, the surviving practice of Saul Bass in Los Angeles. The studio of Saul Bass on Sunset Boulevard in Hollywood became Lloyd Northover's base on the West Coast of America.

=== 2000–present ===
Lloyd withdrew from Lloyd Northover in 2004. In 2013 the firm merged with branding consultancy, Holmes & Marchant, and traded as part of Holmes & Marchant until April 2016 when the Lloyd Northover brand was relaunched as a stand alone specialist corporate identity and branding consultancy. Lloyd Northover continues to provide brand strategy, corporate design, and implementation under the Lloyd Northover name.

== Education ==
- Apprentice Lithographic Artist, Edwin Jones & Sons (Printers), London 1960–64.
- London School of Printing and Graphic Arts (LSPGA) 1960–64, Graphic Design (part-time).
- South West Essex Technical College and School of Art / Walthamstow School of Art 1964–65, Fine Art. During Lloyd's time at Walthamstow School of Art, the teaching staff included Peter Blake (artist), Derek Boshier, Stephen Willats, and William Green (action painter).
- London College of Printing (LCP) 1965–68, Diploma in Art and Design (DipAD)Hons Graphic Design, First Class Honours. At the LCP, Lloyd's tutors included Tom Eckersley (Head of the Design Department), Walter Jungkind, Stephen Dwoskin, and George Adams, previously named Georg Anthony Adams-Teltscher, a former Bauhaus student.

== Career ==
- Currently: Independent artist and writer
- 2004–2006: Consultant, Lloyd Northover
- 1993–2004: Creative Director and Consultant, Citigate Lloyd Northover.
- 1997: Merged Citigate Lloyd Northover with Bass Yager, the design consultancy founded by Saul Bass in Los Angeles, to create an international design consultancy with offices in Europe, USA and Asia
- 1993: Merged Lloyd Northover with Citigate Design to form Citigate Lloyd Northover
- 1975: Founded Lloyd Northover Ltd with Jim Northover, Joint Creative Director
- 1972–1975: Joint Head of Graphic Design, Allied International Designers, London
- 1968–1972: Senior Designer, Allied International Designers, London
- 1960–1964: Apprentice Lithographic Artist: Edwin Jones & Sons (Printers).

== Exhibitions/collections ==
- The Lloyd Northover Design Archive comprising logotypes, design manuals, ephemera, posters, documents, and transparencies is held at the University of the Arts London (UAL) Archives and Special Collections Centre, London College of Communication, London, and is accessible to students and others by appointment.
- Making History: LCC and the School of Graphic Design, Exhibition, London College of Communication, Autumn 2005.
- Lloyd Northover: Partners in Design, Retrospective at London College of Communication, February–March 2005.
- Lloyd Northover: Perception, Aspiration, Reality, Paperpoint Gallery, London 1989.
- Lloyd Northover at the Design Centre, Exhibition at London and Scottish Design Centres, 1980–1981.
- Work accepted for exhibition by Designers and Art Directors Association (D&AD) and New York Art Directors Club.
- Poster designs in permanent collections of the Royal Shakespeare Company, and Victoria and Albert Museum.

== Selected awards ==
International Design Effectiveness Awards:

- Winner, National Savings and Investments, Digital Media 2005.
- Winner, JMC, Digital Media 2001.
- Winner, Partek, Corporate Identity 1998.
- Winner, Amtico, Office and Commercial Interiors 1992.
- Grand Prix, Courtaulds, Corporate Identity 1989.

New York Art Directors Club:

- International Gold Award for Packaging Design 1989.

== Memberships ==
- Fellow, Chartered Society of Designers
- Fellow, Royal Society of Arts
- Member, Designers and Art Directors Association (D&AD)

== Writing ==
- For a selection of Lloyd's writings on graphic design and corporate identity see the Reflections section of his online archive. http://www.johnlloyd.uk.com/refl_index.php?main=5

== Personal ==
John David Lloyd is married to Julia Patricia Lloyd and has three children: Adam, Elinor and Anna.

== Sources ==
- Creative Review. John Lloyd: 50 years in graphic design. CR Blog. 14 September 2010 http://www.creativereview.co.uk/cr-blog/2010/september/john-lloyd-50-years-in-graphic-design-an-online-archive
- Lloyd, John & Northover, Jim. Double Vision. Director Magazine. p. 52. (October 2001). UK
- Huygens, Frederique (1989). British Design image & identity. Great Britain. Thames & Hudson. ISBN 0-500-27558-0
- Lambert, Fred (Editor 1983). Graphics UK: A Directory of Designers. Designer Publications. UK. ISBN 0-86306-010-2
- Northover, Jim. The redesign of Courtaulds. Finance Magazine (January 1989). UK
- Morris, Neil. The birth of the C-mark. Design Magazine (September 1987). UK
- Halas, John. Studios: Lloyd Northover Ltd. Novum Gebrauschgraphik (9/1980)
- Halas, John. The Design Team Lloyd Northover. Novum Gebrauschgraphik. p. 12. (6/1984)
- Novum Gebrauschgraphik, volume 59 (1988)
- Lee, Susan. The Rockwater Story. Design Management Institute Journal, volume 2, No.1, (Winter 1991)
- Barnett, Bernard. Image building graphics. Design Magazine issue 289 (January 1973). UK
- D&AD Profiles https://web.archive.org/web/20110929042511/http://www.dandad.org/inspiration/profiles/individuals/john-lloyd/ John Lloyd]
- Debretts People of Today. http://www.debretts.com/people/biographies/browse/l/16047/John%20David+LLOYD.aspx
