= Design Triangle =

Design Triangle was a transport design firm, based in Cambridge, UK. Founded in 1986, Design Triangle specializes in the design of the interiors and exteriors of vehicles (and vessels) for public transport, particularly rail passenger cars. The company was dissolved in 2017.

== Rail Vehicles ==
Design Triangle is best known for the concept design of the interior and exterior of the Heathrow Express Class 332 trains and the exterior design of the MTR Hong Kong Airport Express. Other published work includes the design of the Iarnród Eireann Inter-City Mark 4 trains and the interior concept design for the Class 378 rail cars for London Overground. Design Triangle also recently redesigned the Swiss Railways’ range of vehicle interiors.

According to Jane's World Railways, other projects include interior and exterior concept designs for Rotterdam Metro, STIB Brussels Tramway 2000, Connex Melbourne X'Trapolis 100 trains, Spoornet 9E loco driver's cab refurbishment, design of the exterior and driver's cab for Hong Kong's MTR Airport Express train, passenger flow studies for DLR Docklands Light Railway, interior design for BAE Systems on Kawasaki's MARC III Bi-Level coaches, interior design concepts for Madrid Metro and rail seat prototypes for KAB Seating.

== Marine ==
Design Triangle has created industrial design concepts for the exteriors and interiors of fast ferries and water taxis for Damen Shipyards, including the Dubai Water Taxi and the Damen DFF 3207 low wash catamaran for Dubai.

== Services ==
Design Triangle designs the form, aesthetics and layout of vehicles, including interiors, exteriors and driver’s cabs, from industrial design concepts to 3D CAD models and manufacturing drawings. Services are provided to railway companies, rail vehicle manufacturers and component manufacturers.

== Award ==
At the Design Business Association's Design Effectiveness Awards in 2000, Design Triangle won the Grand Prix and Design Management awards for the design of the Class 332 trains, as a collaborative team with BAA Heathrow Express, Wolff Olins and Glazer.
