= MTR Adtranz–CAF EMU =

EMU trainset operated by the Hong Kong MTR

A-Train / CAF-Train (LAR-Train) Adtranz–CAF EMU 港鐵機場鐵路Adtranz–CAF列車
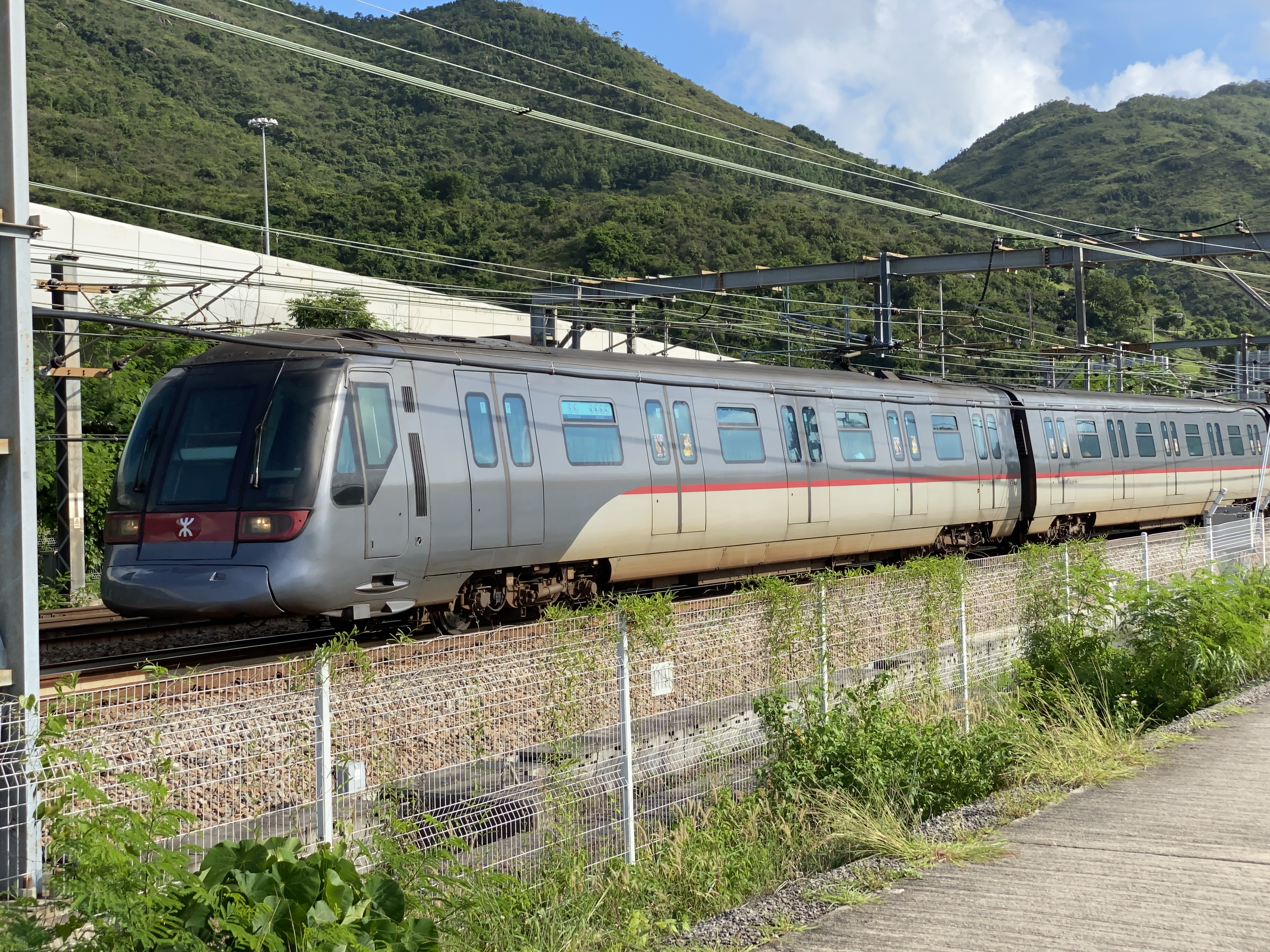
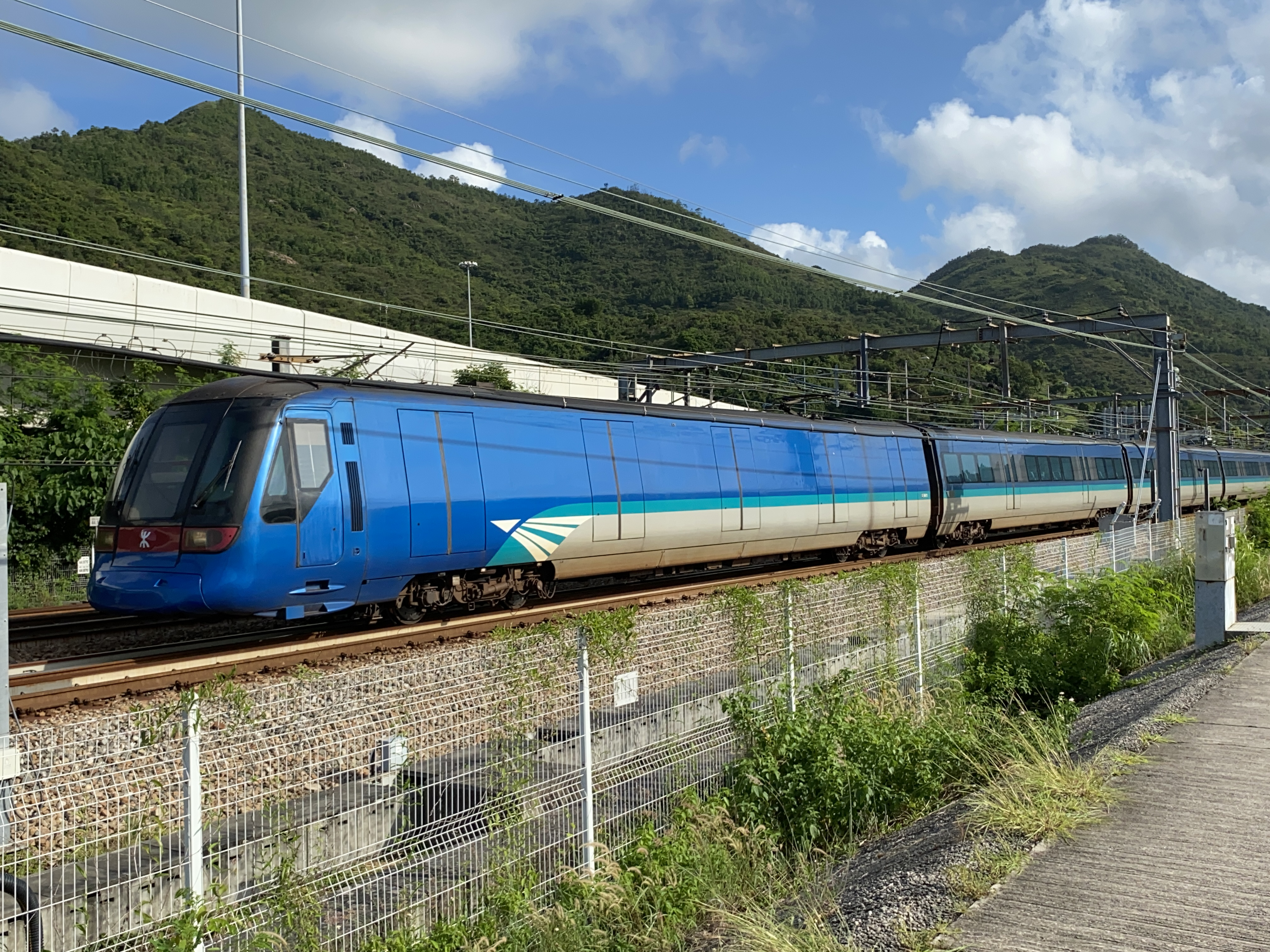
- Tung Chung line train Airport Express train

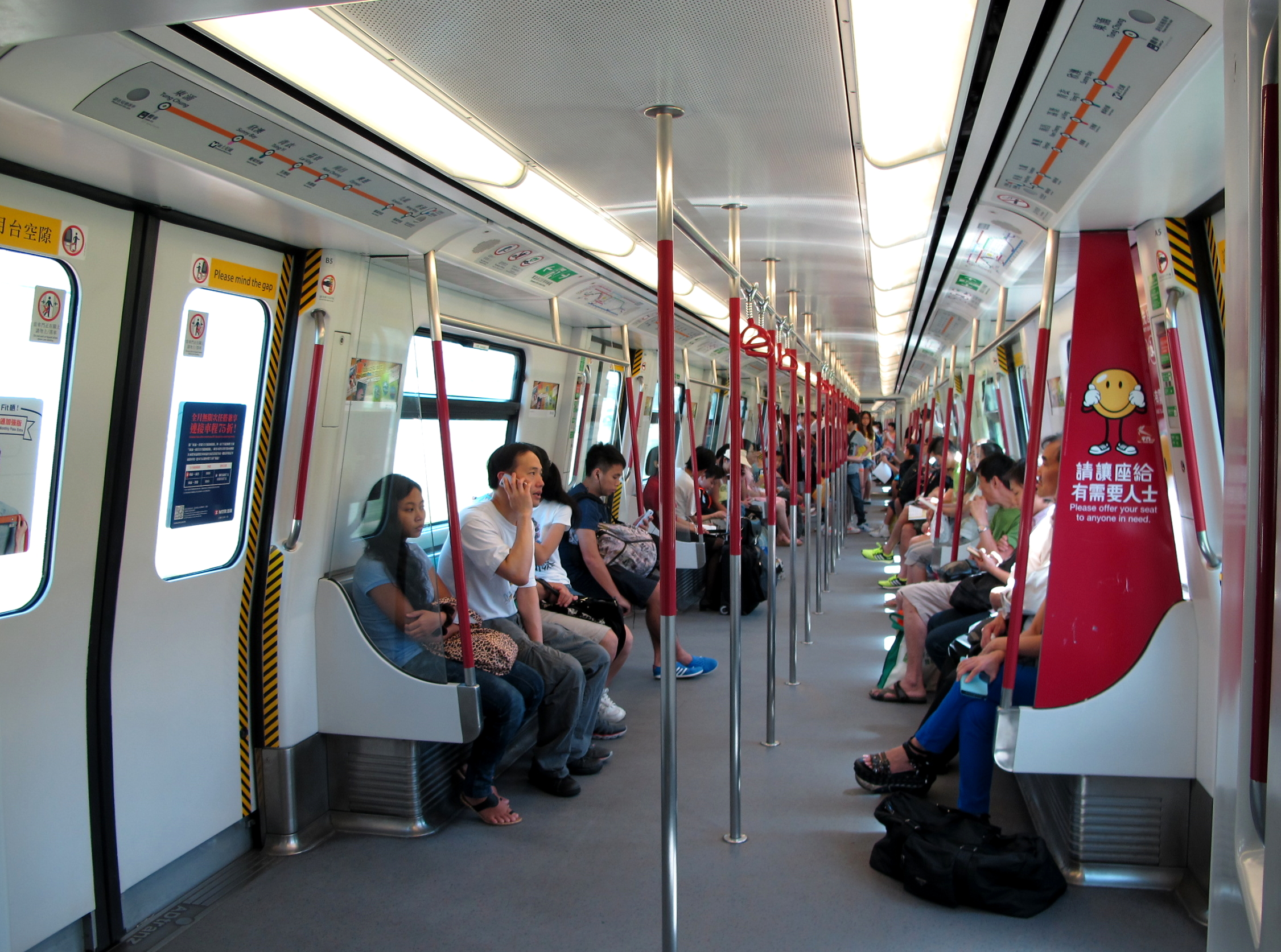
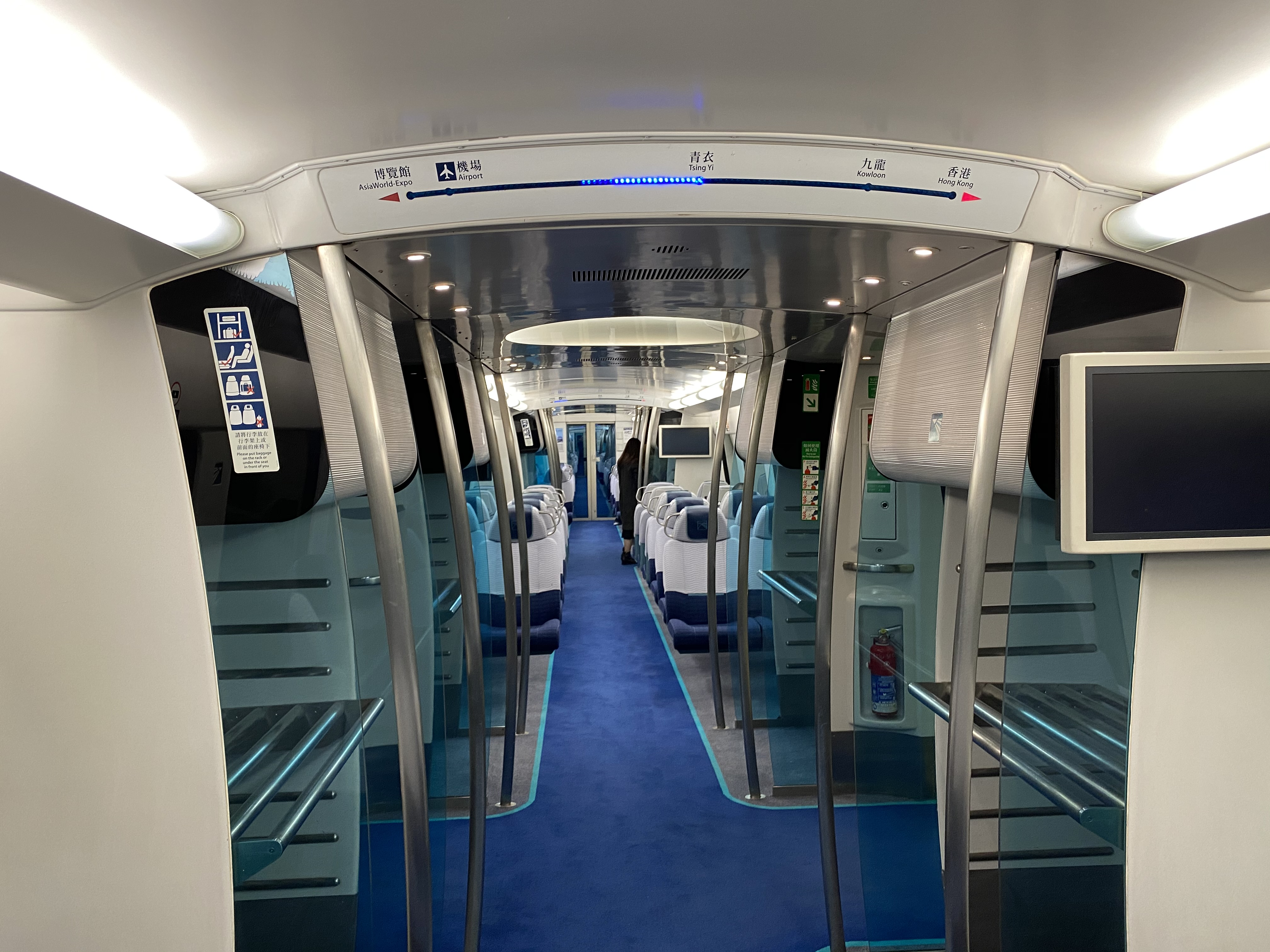
- Interior of the Tung Chung Line version Interior of the Airport Express
- In service: 22 June 1998; 28 years ago – present
- Manufacturers: Adtranz, CAF
- Designers: Exterior and Cab: Design Triangle Tung Chung Line Interior: Jones Garrard Airport Express Interior: Design Triangle
- Order no.: 551
- Built at: Beasain, Spain
- Constructed: 1996–1997
- Entered service: 22 June 1998; 28 years ago
- Refurbished: 2008, 2020–2021 (AEL)
- Number built: 184 cars; Tung Chung line : 96 cars (12 sets); Airport Express : 88 cars (11 sets)
- Formation: 8 cars per trainset (originally 7 cars)
- Fleet numbers: Tung Chung line : V601~V801 - V612~V812 (Vxxx, Wxxx, Xxxx, Y7xx, Z8xx); Airport Express : E101~K401 - E111~K411 (E1xx, Fxxx, Gxxx, H2xx, J4xx, K4xx)
- Operator: MTR
- Depot: Siu Ho Wan
- Lines served: Tung Chung line; Airport Express

Specifications
- Car body construction: Aluminum alloy with fiberglass end bonnets
- Train length: 184.2 m (604 ft 4.0 in)
- Car length: 24.6 m (80 ft 8.5 in) (end cars); 22.5 m (73 ft 9.8 in) (intermediate cars)
- Width: 3,096 mm (10 ft 1.9 in)
- Height: 3.7 m (12 ft 1.7 in) (without pantograph) (air conditioners flush with roof)
- Platform height: 1.25 m (4 ft 1.2 in)
- Doors: 5 per side (TCL stock and AEL K car); 2 per side (AEL stock)
- Maximum speed: 140 km/h (87 mph) (design); 135 km/h (84 mph) (service)
- Traction system: AEG DASU 6.1 3-level GTO–VVVF
- Traction motors: 24 × AEG BASu 5551/4 265 kW (355 hp) 3-phase AC induction motor
- Power output: 6.36 MW (8,530 hp)
- Acceleration: 1 m/s^{2} (3.3 ft/s^{2})
- Deceleration: 1.1 m/s^{2} (3.6 ft/s^{2}) (service); 1.35 m/s^{2} (4.4 ft/s^{2}) (emergency)
- Electric systems: 1,500 V DC overhead lines
- Current collection: Pantograph
- UIC classification: Bo′Bo′+Bo′Bo′+2′2′+Bo′Bo′+Bo′Bo′+2′2′+Bo′Bo′+Bo′Bo′
- Braking systems: SAB-WABCO electropneumatic and regenerative
- Safety systems: ATO (SACEM) and ATP
- Coupling system: Faiveley
- Track gauge: 1,432 mm (4 ft 8 3/8 in)

The Adtranz-CAF EMU (also known as A-Train, CAF-Train or LAR-Train) is an electric multiple unit (EMU) train that operates on the MTR rapid transit railway system in Hong Kong. There are two variants, one used on the conventional Tung Chung line, and a more luxurious version used on the Airport Express. The vehicle interiors were designed for MTR by Jones Garrard (Tung Chung Line) and Design Triangle (Airport Express), while the vehicle exterior and driver's cab interior were designed in the UK by Design Triangle (the first two model building of these were made in Spain by Diara Design). These two variations are built jointly by Adtranz and Construcciones y Auxiliar de Ferrocarriles (CAF) and manufactured in Spain in 1996–1997.

== History ==
On 21 November 1994, the joint venture of AEG Schienenfahrzeuge GmbH (later Adtranz) and Construcciones y Auxiliar de Ferrocarriles was awarded the contract to build the rolling stock for the Lantau Airport Railway under Contract 551.

== Details ==
The Adtranz–CAF trains initially were formed as 7-car sets up until 2003 (Tung Chung Line) and 2005 (Airport Express) when the 8th car was added due to the opening of Nam Cheong Station and AsiaWorld-Expo Station respectively. They were built and assembled by CAF in Spain while Adtranz contributed control and traction equipment. Their maximum speed is 140 km/h (87 mph) but with service limits to 135 km/h (84 mph), with maximum acceleration of 1 m/s^{2} (3.3 ft/s^{2}), maximum service brake deceleration of 1.1 m/s^{2} (3.6 ft/s^{2}) and emergency brake of 1.35 m/s^{2} (4.4 ft/s^{2}). These trains are equipped with the AEG DASU 6.1 3-level GTO–VVVF inverter.

=== Tung Chung line stock ===
Trains of the Tung Chung line were made up of 7 cars up until 2003, and were increased to 8 cars with the 'W7XX' car added in 2003 when the West Rail line and Nam Cheong station was opened. The total number of cars ordered was 96.

Tung Chung line cars
car type	driver cab	motor	pantograph	auto- coupler	length (mm)	seat	standing capacity	wheelchair space	amount
V car	✓	✓	✓	✗	24600	42	252	2	24
W car	✗	✓	✗	✗	22500	48	252	✗	24
X car (trailer)	✗	✗	✗	✓	22500	48	252	✗	24
Y car	✗	✓	✓	✗	22500	48	252	✗	12
Z car	✗	✓	✗	✓	22500	48	252	✗	12

The configuration of a TCL train is (Westbound) V6XX-W6XX-X6XX-Y7XX-W7XX-X7XX-Z8XX-V8XX (Eastbound).

=== Airport Express stock ===
Trains of Airport Express (AEL) were made up of 7 cars (6 passenger cars and a luggage car) up until 2005. The total number of cars ordered was 88. To cope with the extra traffic demand derived from the opening of AsiaWorld–Expo station, an additional 'F2XX' car was added to each train to form a total of 8 cars. However, the 'K4XX' cars function as baggage container cars for bulky baggage checked in via the in-town check-in services at Hong Kong and Kowloon stations.

Airport Express cars
car type	driver cab	motor	pantograph	auto- coupler	length (mm)	seat	standing capacity	amount
E car	✓	✓	✓	✗	24600	60	84	11
F car	✗	✓	✗	✗	22500	64	84	22
G car (trailer)	✗	✗	✗	✓	22500	64	84	22
H car	✗	✓	✓	✓	22500	64	84	11
J car	✗	✓	✗	✓	22500	64	84	11
K car (van)	✓	✓	✓	✗	24600	13 baggage containers		11

The configuration of an AEL train is (Westbound) E1XX-F1XX-G1XX-H2XX-F2XX-G2XX-J4XX-K4XX (Eastbound). Except for 'K4XX' cars that have 5 doors on each side, all other cars in AEL have 2 doors on each side and 1 wheelchair space. Each passenger car is mounted with 2 LCD monitors at each end for broadcasting entertainment or tourist television programmes and train announcements, such as next-station broadcasts.

== In popular culture ==
Two AEL CAF-Trains are featured in the film Shock Wave 2. The unit E104/K404 was destroyed by the explosives and the Davy Crockett bomb, the other one was damaged by the nuclear device's shockwave and stalled on the broken Tsing Ma Bridge.
