= Tung Chung West station =

Future MTR station in the New Territories, Hong Kong

Tung Chung West 東涌西
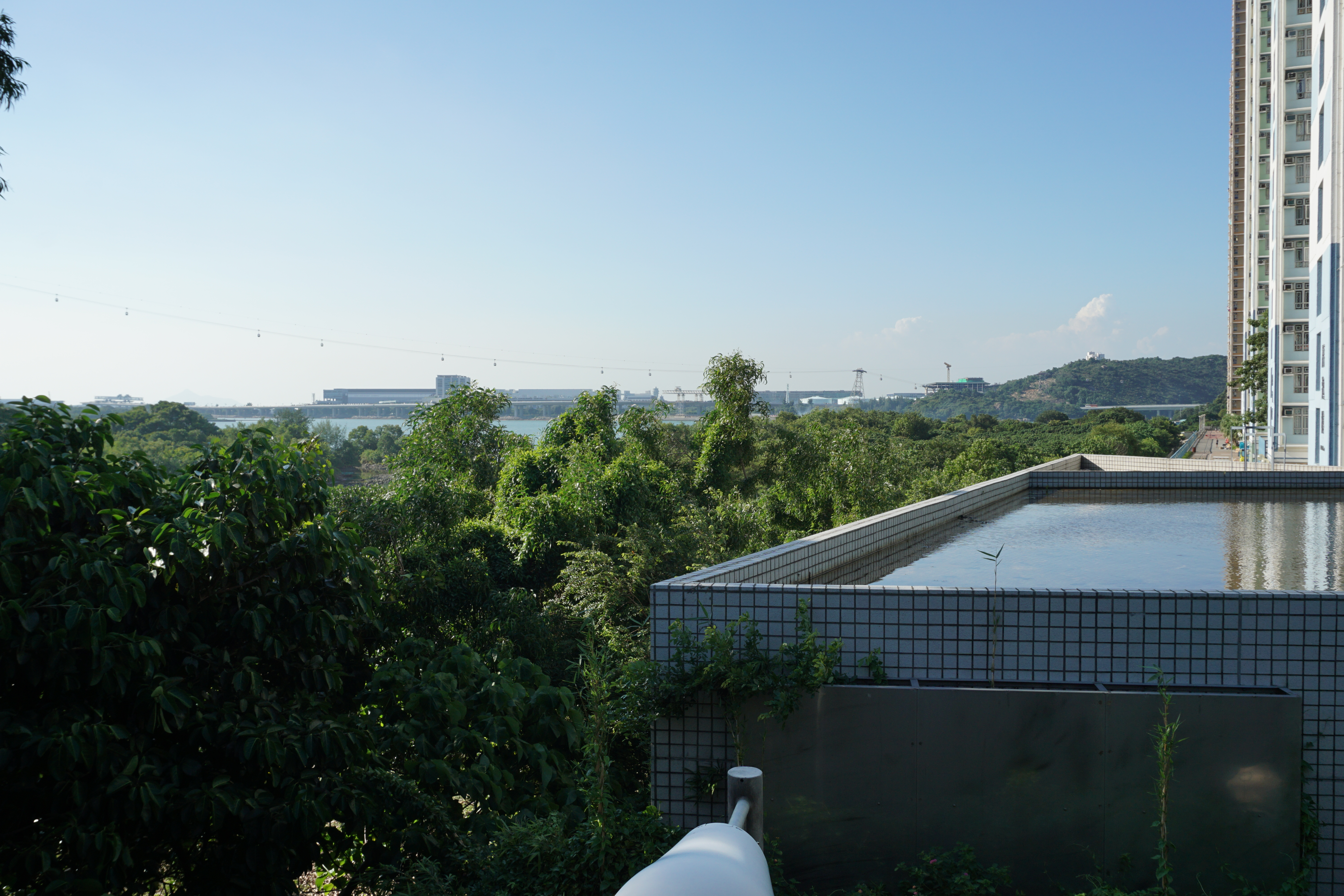
- Proposed station site

Chinese name
- Traditional Chinese: 東涌西
- Simplified Chinese: 东涌西
- Cantonese Yale: Dūngchūng
- Literal meaning: West of the East (of a) branch of a river
Transcriptions
Standard Mandarin
- Hanyu Pinyin: Dōngchōng Xī
Yue: Cantonese
- Yale Romanization: Dūngchūng
- Jyutping: Dung1cung1 Sai1

General information
- Location: Tung Chung; Islands District, Hong Kong
- Coordinates: 22°16′50″N 113°56′03″E
- System: Future MTR rapid transit station (Approved, construction begins 2023)
- Owner: MTR Corporation
- Operator: MTR Corporation
- Line: Tung Chung line
- Platforms: 2

Construction
- Structure type: Underground
- Platform levels: 1

Other information
- Status: Under construction
- Station code: TCW
- Website: Tung Chung Line Extension

History
- Opening: Expected: 2029; 3 years' time

Key dates
- 2020: Planning and design commences
- 2021: Project gazetted under the Railways Ordinance (amendments in 2022)
- 2022: Environmental permit approved
- 2023: Commencement of construction
- 2029: Expected completion of construction

Services
Preceding station	MTR	Following station
Future
Tung Chung towards Hong Kong	Tung Chung line Tung Chung line extension	Terminus
Location
- Location within MTR

Tung Chung West (Chinese: 東涌西) is the future MTR terminus station of the Tung Chung line, west of Tung Chung, Lantau Island, New Territories, Hong Kong, which would follow on from Tung Chung station. When Yat Tung Estate (Trad. Chinese: 逸東邨) in Tung Chung West was constructed, the MTR Corporation and the Hong Kong SAR Government reserved a site to build the station. It will replace Airport as the westernmost railway station in Hong Kong when it opens in 2029.

The station is planned to be located to the west of Yat Tung Estate.

== History ==
On 18 February 2009, the government replied to the Legislative Council that a decision or timetable for the construction of Tung Chung West Station was not available for the time being.

In 2013, Tung Chung West Extension was mentioned in the review and update of the Railway Development Strategy 2000, after the government launched the "Tung Chung New Town Extension Study" in 2012 to further expand and develop Tung Chung New Town. The updated strategy, released in September 2014 as the Railway Development Strategy 2014 (RDS-2014), confirms plans to build the Tung Chung West extension, and that the projected cost is $6 billion. An "implementation window" of 2020 to 2024 was noted.

The New Lantao Bus company, which currently operates a circular bus route between Yat Tung Estate and Tung Chung station, petitioned the Legislative Council against construction of the new station.

The construction of the station was approved and gazetted on 10 January 2023, with construction beginning in mid-2023 and it is expected to be completed in 2029. In May of that year, the construction contract was awarded to a joint venture between French contractor Bouygues and Dragages Hong Kong.

== Design ==
The station will be located underground, accompanied by two ventilation facilities adjacent to it. Two exits will be constructed near Yat Tung Estate.

== See also ==
- Tung Chung East station
- Oyster Bay station
