= Oyster Bay station (MTR) =

Future MTR station in the New Territories, Hong Kong

Oyster Bay 小蠔灣
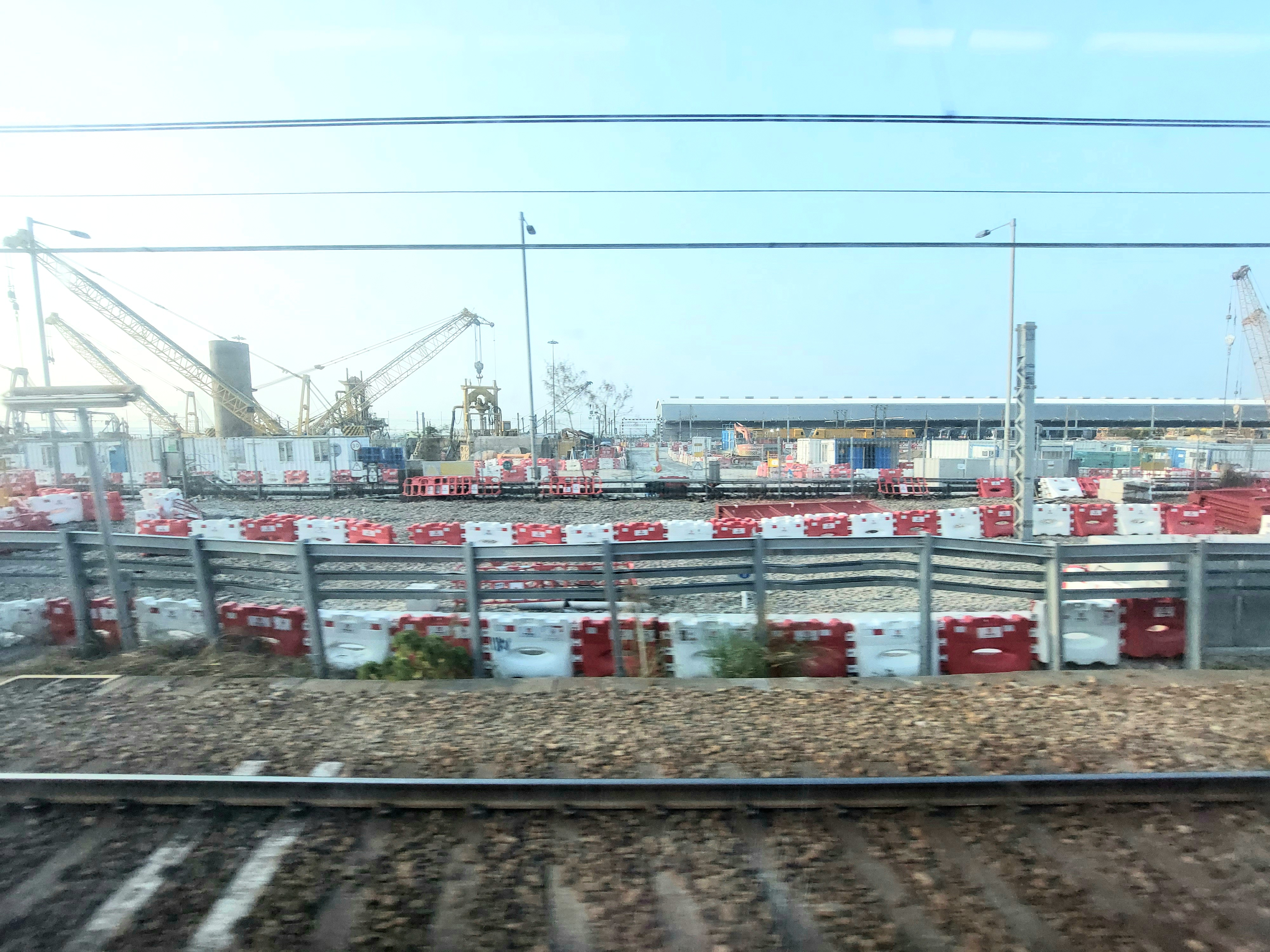
- Location of Oyster Bay station

Chinese name
- Traditional Chinese: 小蠔灣
- Simplified Chinese: 小蚝湾
- Literal meaning: Small oyster bay
Transcriptions
Standard Mandarin
- Hanyu Pinyin: Xiǎo Háo Wān
Yue: Cantonese
- Jyutping: Siu2 Hou4 Waan1

General information
- Other names: Siu Ho Wan (Early planning)
- Location: Cheung Tung Road, Siu Ho Wan; Islands District, Hong Kong
- Coordinates: 22°18′21″N 113°58′54″E
- Elevation: Ground Level
- System: Future MTR rapid transit station (Gazetted in 2021)
- Owner: MTR Corporation
- Operator: MTR Corporation
- Line: Tung Chung line
- Platforms: 2 side platforms
- Tracks: 4 (2 non-stop for Airport Express)

Other information
- Station code: OYB

History
- Opening: 2030; 4 years' time

Services
Preceding station	MTR	Following station
Sunny Bay towards Hong Kong	Tung Chung line Future	Tung Chung East towards Tung Chung West
Airport Express does not stop here
Location
- Location within MTR

Oyster Bay (Chinese: 小蠔灣), previously known as Siu Ho Wan in proposals, is an MTR station on the Tung Chung line to be constructed southwest of Siu Ho Wan depot in Siu Ho Wan, on Lantau Island. The station will be built at-grade around existing Tung Chung line tracks. The construction of the station was gazetted by the Hong Kong Government in June 2021. The station is expected to open for service in 2030, with the depot remaining in use.

It is expected that the station will serve new properties surrounding Siu Ho Wan depot, which the station will be named after.

== History ==
As part of the Airport Core Programme for the new Hong Kong International Airport, land was reclaimed at Siu Ho Wan for a MTR depot to service Tung Chung line and Airport Express trains. The depot opened in 1998.

Discussion about a new station and transit-oriented development at the Siu Ho Wan site were first discussed in the mid 2000s, in conjunction with the Hong Kong–Zhuhai–Macau Bridge. The 2007 Concept Plan for Lantau proposed that the site would be used for a logistics hub.

In the mid 2010s, news reports noted that the site would be developed for housing, and a new station built to serve the site. In 2016, Leung Chun-ying announced in the 2016 Policy Address that the Government was working with MTR Corporation regarding future development sites, including at Siu Ho Wan Depot.

In 2020, Carrie Lam announced in the 2020 Policy Address that the Government had completed the Zoning Plan for the site, working with MTR. It was estimated that around 20,000 residential units could be provided on the site. In December 2021, MTR's proposal for the site was approved by the Town Planning Board. The 30-hectare (74-acre) site will be developed in four phases, delivering 10,720 private flats and 10,480 public flats (mostly subsidised sale), as well as a 30,000 m^{2} (320,000 sq ft) shopping mall.

In September 2022, MTR announced that a land exchange with Government for public housing had been accepted, and that a project agreement for the construction of Oyster Bay station had been agreed. The Siu Ho Wan depot will remain in operation throughout construction, continuing to serve the Airport Express and Tung Chung lines. MTR expected construction would begin in 2023, and be open in 2030. However, in April 2023, the MTR Corporation announced it would re-tender the project at 'an appropriate time' after a failed bid in February of the same year, citing slow paces of economic recovery and high interest rates.

In July 2025, MTR Corporation suspended foundation works for the overhead cable at its Oyster Bay station project on Lantau Island due to signs of “upheaving”. The suspension has led to delays in the construction schedule, with progress on the project reported as significantly slowed.

== Station layout ==
The station will be built at-grade along the existing shared track for the Airport Express and Tung Chung lines, southwest of Siu Ho Wan depot. The platform layout will be similar to the Tung Chung line section at Nam Cheong station, with two additional tracks and two side platforms to be constructed on both sides of the existing Tung Chung line tracks. Its concourse will be built above Siu Ho Wan depot and the platform level.

Podium
Concourse	Exit
Platforms	Side platform, doors will open on the left
Platforms	Platform 2	Tung Chung line towards Hong Kong (Sunny Bay) →
Platforms	Airport Express	Airport Express does not stop here →
Platforms	Airport Express	← Airport Express does not stop here
Platforms	Platform 1	← Tung Chung line towards Tung Chung West (Tung Chung East)
Platforms	Side platform, doors will open on the left
