= Ying Tung Estate =

Public housing estate in Tung Chung, Hong Kong

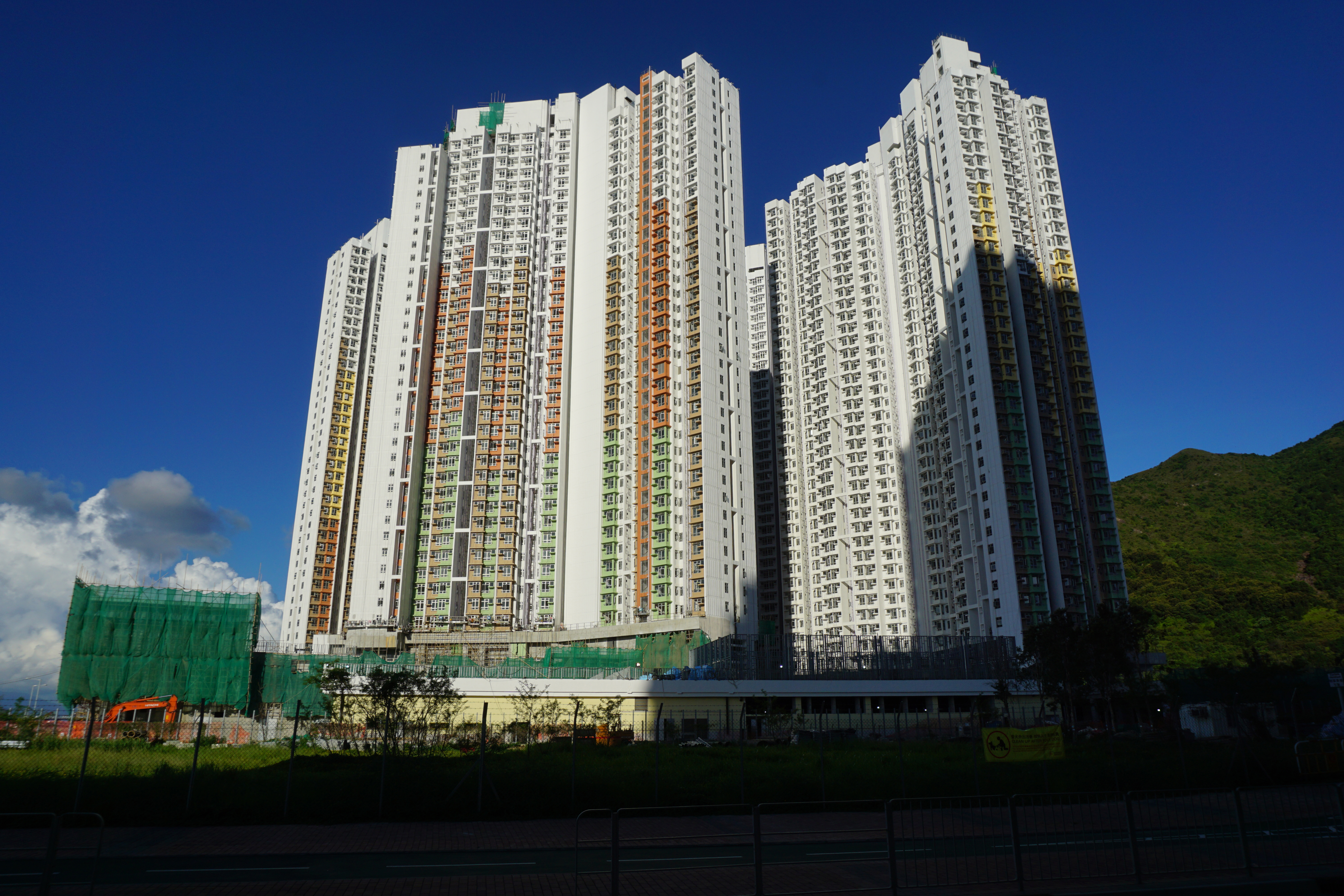
- Ying Tung Estate
- Interactive map of Ying Tung Estate

General information
- Location: 12 Ying Tung Road, Tung Chung; Lantau Island; New Territories, Hong Kong
- Coordinates: 22.29631°N 113.95357°E
- Status: Completed
- Category: Public rental housing
- No. of blocks: 4
- No. of units: 3,580

Construction
- Constructed: 2018; 8 years ago
- Authority: Hong Kong Housing Authority

Ying Tung Estate (Chinese: 迎東邨) is a public housing estate located at 12 Ying Tung Road in Tung Chung, Lantau Island, New Territories, Hong Kong. It consists of four residential buildings completed in 2018, making it the first public housing project completed in the Tung Chung North area. The estate, developed by the Hong Kong Housing Authority, contains 3,580 flats.

Although it is administratively part of Tung Chung North, it sits directly adjacent to the massive reclamation zone of the Tung Chung New Town Extension (East). As a result of this extension, the estate will be served by the future Tung Chung East station, a MTR station currently under construction immediately to its east.

== Houses ==
Name	Chinese name	Building type	Completed
Ying Hei House	迎喜樓	Non-standard	2018
Ying Fok House	迎福樓	Non-standard	2018
Ying Chui House	迎趣樓	Non-standard	2018
Ying Yuet House	迎悅樓	Non-standard	2018

== Transportation ==
The estate will be served by Tung Chung East station, which is located within walking distance. The station is expected to open for service in 2029.

Pending the station's completion, residents rely on feeder buses to the nearby Tung Chung Station, and North Lantau External Bus Routes for travel to urban areas. Due to the estate's close proximity to Hong Kong International Airport, it relies on North Lantau shuttle routes, including Citybus route S56 for the passenger terminal, and Long Win Bus route S64P, which runs in peak hours, for the airport catering area.

The estate is currently served by Ying Tung Estate Bus Terminus, and Cheung Tung Estate Bus Terminus.

== See also ==
- Public housing estates on Lantau Island
