= Airport Express (MTR) =

Hong Kong railway line

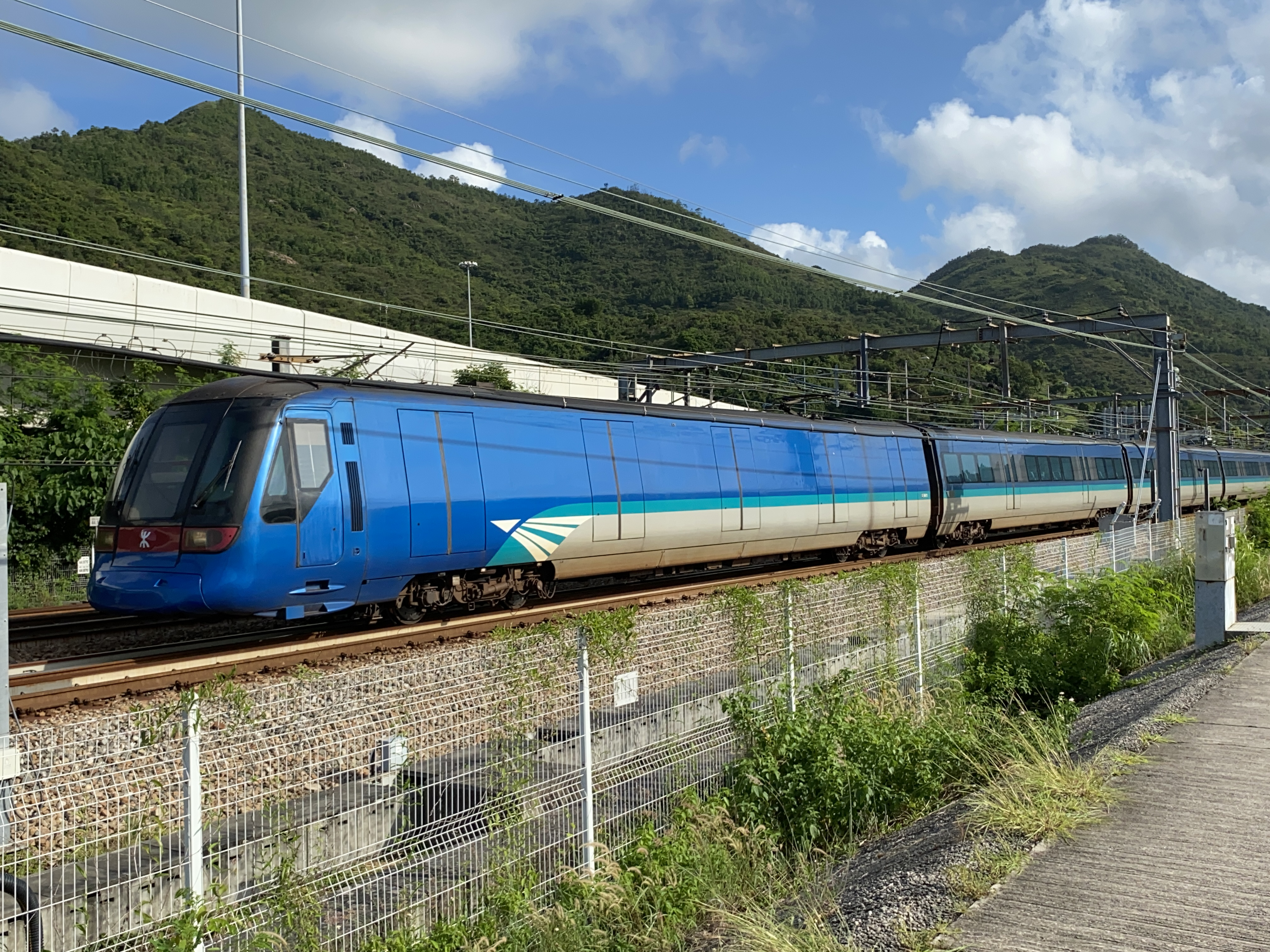
- An Airport Express train near Sunny Bay, bound for Hong Kong

Overview
- Native name: 機場快綫
- Status: Operational
- Owner: MTR Corporation
- Locale: Districts: Islands, Kwai Tsing, Yau Tsim Mong, Central & Western
- Termini: Hong Kong; AsiaWorld–Expo
- Connecting lines: ■ Tung Chung line (Via Hong Kong, Kowloon, Tsing Yi); ■ Tsuen Wan line (Via Hong Kong-Central); ■ Island line (Via Hong Kong-Central)
- Stations: 5
- Color on map: Teal (#00888A)

Service
- Type: Airport rail link
- System: MTR
- Operator: MTR Corporation
- Depot: Siu Ho Wan
- Rolling stock: Adtranz–CAF EMU
- Ridership: 34,600 daily average (October 2023)

History
- Work began: November 1994; 32 years ago
- Opened: 6 July 1998; 28 years ago
- Last extension: 20 December 2005; 20 years ago

Technical
- Line length: 35.2 km (21.9 mi)
- Track gauge: 1,432 mm (4 ft 8 3/8 in)
- Electrification: 1,500 V DC (Overhead line)
- Operating speed: 135 km/h (84 mph)
- Signalling: Advanced SelTrac CBTC (future)
- Train protection system: SACEM (to be replaced)
Route map

Airport Express
- Traditional Chinese: 機場快綫
- Simplified Chinese: 机场快线
- Cantonese Yale: Gēichèuhng Faaisin
Transcriptions
Standard Mandarin
- Hanyu Pinyin: Jīcháng Kuàixiàn
Yue: Cantonese
- Yale Romanization: Gēichèuhng Faaisin
- Jyutping: Gei1coeng4 Faai3sin3
- IPA: [kéi.tsʰœ̭ːŋ fāːi.sīːn]

The Airport Express (Chinese: 機場快綫) is one of the ten heavy rail lines of the Hong Kong MTR system (excluding the light rail network). It links the urban area with Hong Kong International Airport and the AsiaWorld–Expo exhibition and convention centre.

It is the only rail link to the airport. It runs parallel to the Tung Chung line, a rapid transit line, from Hong Kong station to just south of the channel between Lantau Island and Chek Lap Kok island, on which the airport was constructed. The line continues to the airport and terminates at AsiaWorld–Expo. The Tung Chung line terminates in the adjacent Tung Chung new town, with bus service to various areas at the airport, including the passenger terminals.

There is direct access to the Tung Chung Line via Hong Kong, Kowloon and Tsing Yi stations, but access to the Tsuen Wan Line and the Island line must be reached via the pedestrian bridge to Central. The journey from Hong Kong station to the airport takes 24 minutes.

== History ==
In October 1989, the Hong Kong government decided to replace the overcrowded Kai Tak Airport, located in Kowloon, with a new airport to be constructed at Chek Lap Kok. The government invited the Mass Transit Railway Corporation to build an express line to the airport. The project began when the Chinese and British governments settled the financial and land agreements in November 1994.

During the construction, the consultants for the Lantau Airport Railway, such as Arup, Halcrow, Meinhardt, Hyder Consulting, and others.

The Lantau Airport Railway was developed as two separate MTR lines, the Tung Chung line and the Airport Express, with the two lines sharing tracks in some sections. It cost was projected to cost HK$35.1 billion. The Airport Express began service on 6 July 1998, the opening date of the new Hong Kong International Airport. The line initially terminated at Airport station and the entire journey time was 23 minutes.

With the opening of Sunny Bay station on the Tung Chung line in June 2005, the total journey time between the Airport and Hong Kong stations was increased to 24 minutes. With the opening of AsiaWorld–Expo, the line was extended to AsiaWorld–Expo station on 20 December 2005 and a journey on the entire route takes 28 minutes.

== Route ==
Route of the Airport Express

The Airport Express line runs from Hong Kong station in Central. It crosses beneath Victoria Harbour before stopping at Kowloon station, which was built on reclaimed land. The line then runs along the western side of the Kowloon peninsula, crosses over the Rambler Channel rail bridge to Tsing Yi, and stops at Tsing Yi station. The line continues on the Lantau Link and runs parallel to the North Lantau Highway to Airport station before terminating at AsiaWorld–Expo station.

The line only shares tracks with the Tung Chung line in the cross-harbour tunnel and from the Lantau Link through the split before reaching the airport island. The two lines have independent tracks and platforms at all stations.

== Features ==
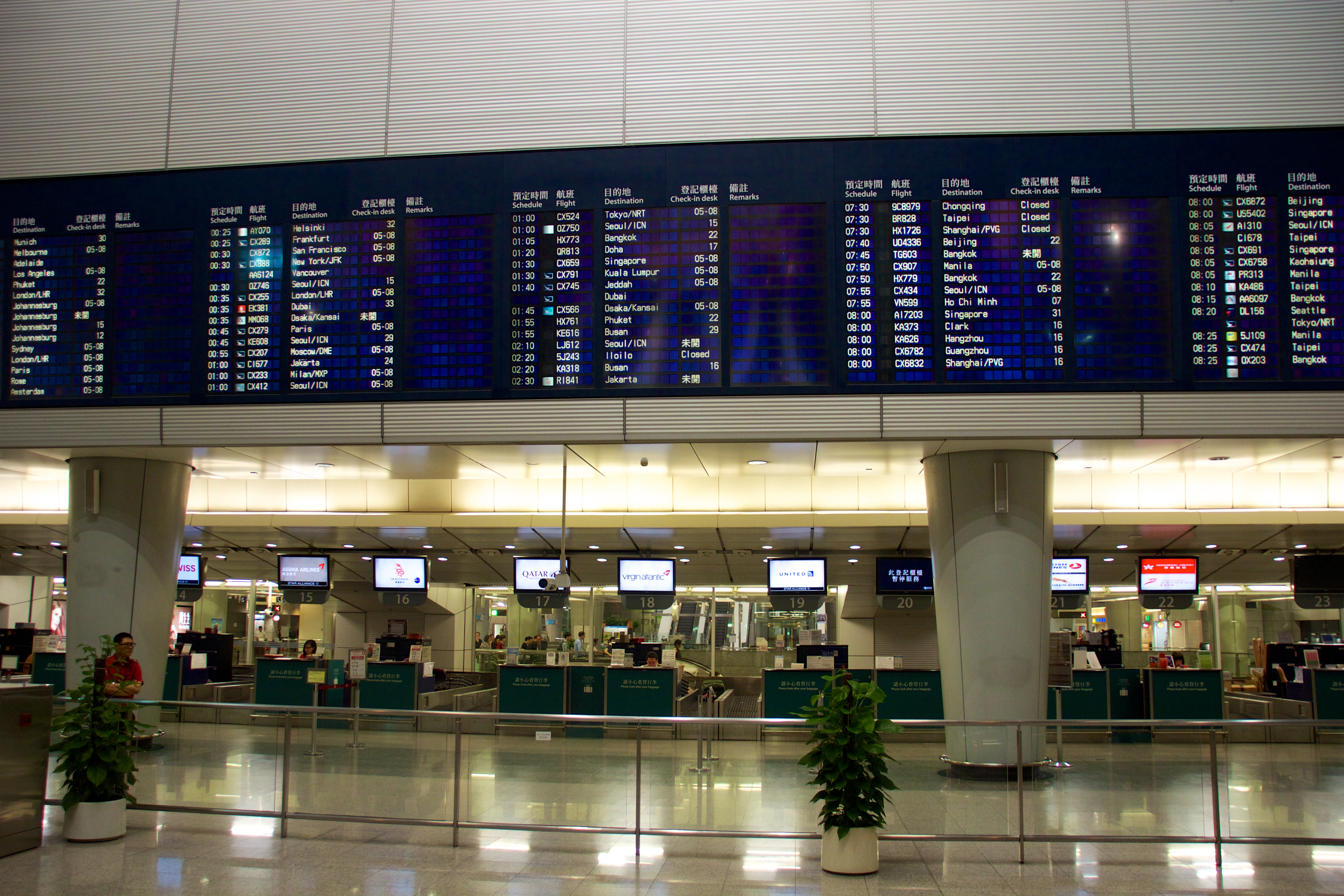
In-Town Check-In counters at Kowloon station

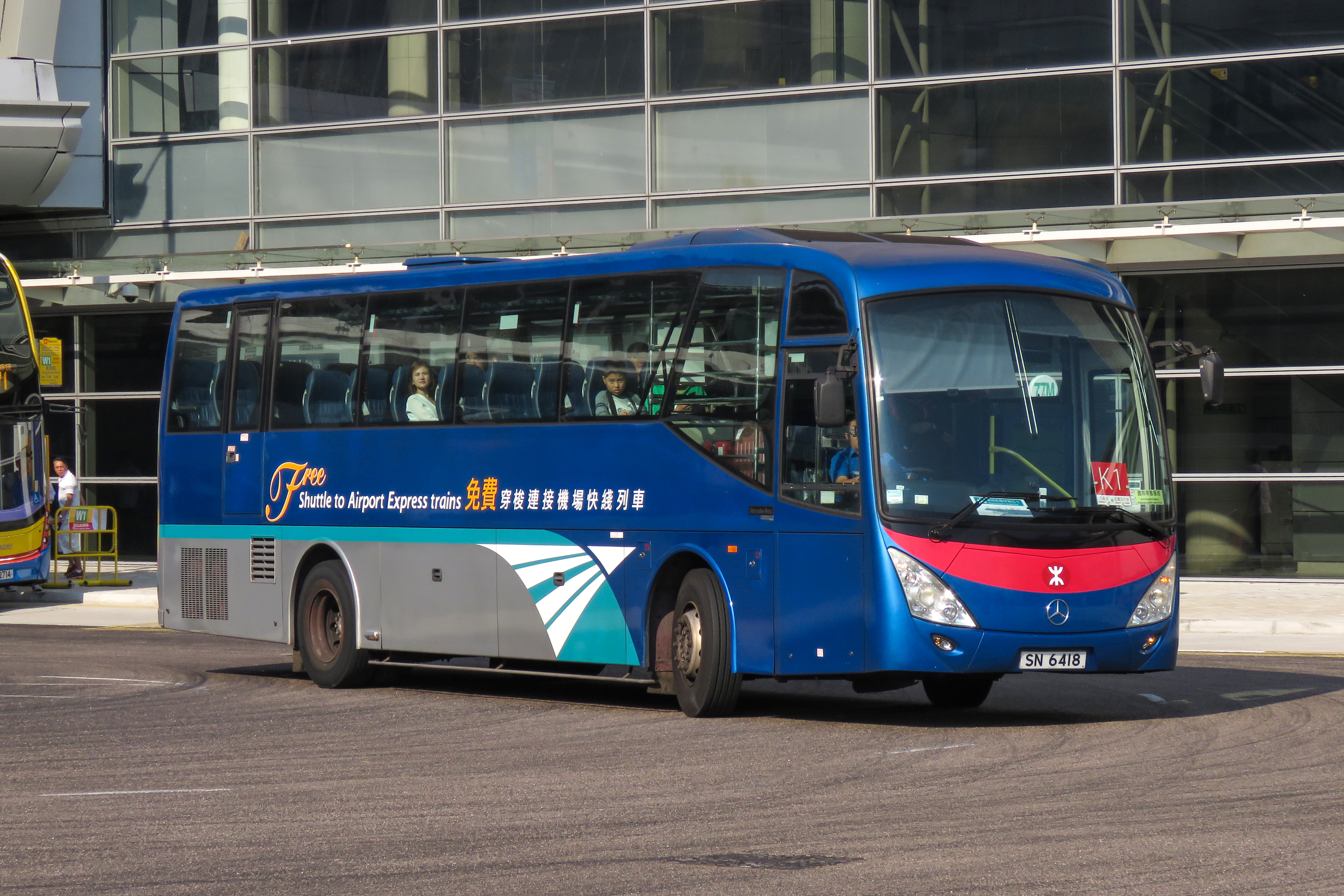
Airport Express Shuttle Bus

The Airport Express offers more spacious and comfortable trains and stations than other MTR services. On the trains, there are luggage racks next to each door, and each seat is equipped with in-seat loudspeakers for current news, advertisements and announcements shown on LCD televisions in front.

=== In-town check-in ===
Airport Express passengers flying with Cathay Pacific, China Airlines, Hong Kong Airlines, Mandarin Airlines, Qantas, or Singapore Airlines are able to use the in-town check-in service at Hong Kong Station or Kowloon Station (Hong Kong Station only for China Airlines, Mandarin Airlines and Singapore Airlines passengers). This includes receiving boarding passes, and checking in luggage, both services usually performed at the airport. This allows travellers to spend time in the city without having to carry their luggage before travelling to the airport bags-free. Each train has a special baggage container car and the checked baggage is scanned in bulk by a mechanised automatic explosive detection system. Upon reaching the airport, baggage is automatically transferred from the express to the traveller's flight. In-town check in is also offered for a greater variety of airlines at both Hong Kong and Kowloon stations.

Baggage trolleys, wide fare gates, and free porter services are available at all stations except AsiaWorld–Expo (only one per exit) to assist passengers with baggage.

=== Shuttle bus service ===
The Airport Express Shuttle Bus is a free service provided exclusively for Airport Express passengers at Hong Kong or Kowloon stations, connecting them with major hotels in the Western District though Quarry Bay on Hong Kong Island and the Yau Tsim Mong District and Hung Hom station in Kowloon. Before boarding, proof of eligibility must be shown, including Airport Express train ticket (Single Journey, Same Day Return, Round Trip, Airport Express Travel Pass), Airline ticket / boarding pass, Airport Staff Octopus card, AsiaWorld–Expo entry pass or event ticket.

The Airport Express Shuttle Bus service was discontinued from 30 June 2020 due to low ridership caused by the COVID-19 pandemic.

In July 2024, the MTR began promoting private hotel shuttle services, which pick up passengers from the former AirPort Express Shuttle Bus bays at Hong Kong and Kowloon stations, providing services to a limited number of hotels in the Hong Kong and Kowloon areas.

=== On-board WiFi and charging service ===
WiFi is available on all Airport Express cars, while USB ports and power points are available in the first and seventh cars.

== Graphic identity ==
The Airport Express visual identity, which includes the logo, vehicle livery, signage, route maps and passenger information, was created in 1999 by Lloyd Northover, the British design consultancy founded by John Lloyd and Jim Northover.

== Fare structure ==
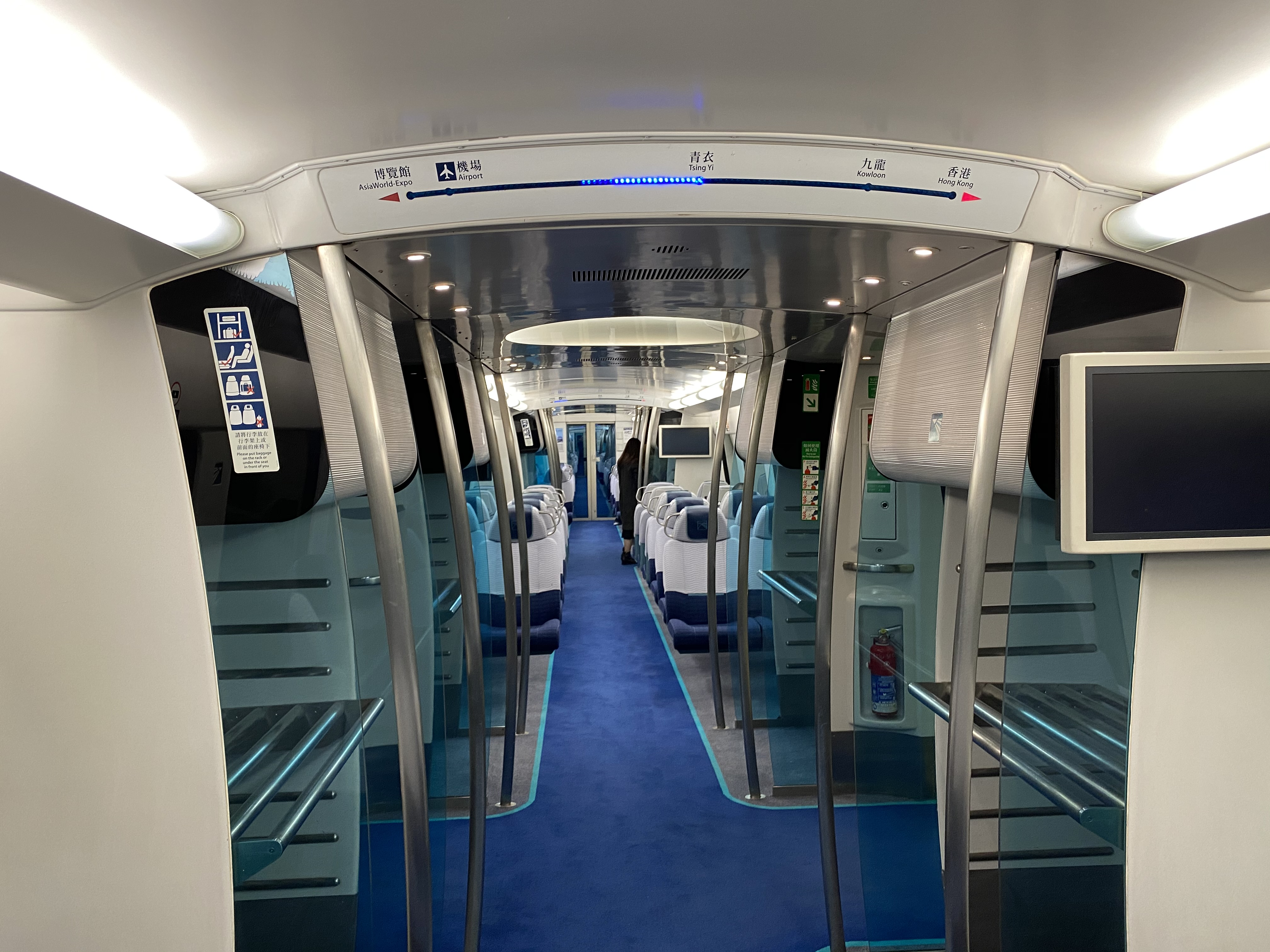
Inside the Airport Express with the Entry/Exit Path, along with the Baggage Compartments. The journey status can be seen from the overhead electronic strip map.

Fares on the Airport Express are substantially higher than main line fares since it is not an commuting line, its main purpose is to quickly transport passengers to and from the airport; thus a separate fare system is used for this line. A single trip by a single journey ticket between Hong Kong, Kowloon and Tsing Yi stations to Airport station cost HK$130, HK$115 and HK$80 respectively, while using an Octopus Card costs HK$120, HK$105 and HK$73 respectively. Return tickets within 30 days cost HK$215, HK$195, and HK$130 respectively. Tickets are available at all MTR stations and the MTR online booking service. Although there are no fare gates at Airport Station, passengers must still buy tickets from the ticket machines located in the Arrivals Hall, on platform 1 of the airport before boarding the train or at destination platforms in order to exit from their destination platform.

Various discounts and rewards programmes are available, such as Group Ticket Discount, free taxi connections, Rewarding programme, Asia Miles programme, etc. Passengers may also buy discounted tickets from local travel agents. Discounts are available for groups of two to four people. Hong Kong residents can also obtain discount coupons, such as those sent from credit card companies. Discounted fares are available to airport staff to encourage commuting on the Airport Express.

Same-day return discount will be given to Octopus card users who have stayed in AsiaWorld–Expo for at least one hour. The discounted fare costs HK$85, HK$78, and HK$53 from Hong Kong, Kowloon, and Tsing Yi stations respectively, and includes a free connection with other MTR lines. A single trip from the Airport to AsiaWorld–Expo is HK$6.5 by Octopus and HK$7 by a single journey ticket.

Given their separate fare structure, Airport Express journeys require an out-of-system transfer if coming from or going to other MTR lines that call at the same or connected stations (e.g. coming from Central towards Hong Kong station or transferring between Airport Express and Tung Chung line trains). However, Airport Express passengers using Octopus cards can connect with all other MTR lines for free in conjunction with the Airport Express journey within one hour of arrival at an Airport Express station.

In March 2010, the MTR began to replace the magnetic tickets used for single, group, and multiple journey tickets with new smart tickets that contain a memory chip. The new system was in full operation by 5 June 2010.

Due to the high fares and small catchment areas of the Airport Express stations, some travellers may instead choose to either use the cheaper, local Tung Chung Line combined with either route S1 jointly operated by LWB and Citybus or route S56 solely operated by Citybus, or make their entire journey by bus. Patronage on the Airport Express has been cannibalised by the Tung Chung line running mostly on the same track.

=== Morning Express Service ===
The Morning Express Service is a special promotional service, allowing passengers from Tsing Yi and Kowloon stations to travel to Hong Kong station to get to work daily (excluding Sundays and public holidays) from 7am to 10am for HK$25 by Octopus. However, passengers who have enjoyed this service may not enjoy a free MTR connection from an Airport Express station.

== Operation and stations ==
Before the SARS pandemic outbreak in March 2003, Airport Express services operated every 10 minutes from the start of service (05:54 from Airport and 05:50 from Hong Kong) and every 12 minutes from 23:28 (from Airport) and 00:00 (from Hong Kong) until the last service 00:48. Train services were reduced to every 12 minutes due to declining passenger ridership. Even after the SARS, trains services did not return to pre-pandemic levels. In 2019, train frequencies were further reduced to every 15 minutes due to the anti-extradition bill protests. Sine the COVID-19 pandemic, the frequencies were reduced again to every 30 minutes. But from 5 November 2022, train services ran every 15-20 minutes throughout the day due to gradual lifting of travel restrictions around the world and the resumption of large-scale activities at AsiaWorld-Expo. Train services have returned to their pre-SARS frequency and timetable since 5 June 2023 in conjunction with the 25th Anniversary since the line's opening.

The Airport Express, along with other MTR heavy rail lines, is monitored by the Operations Control Centre in Tsing Yi.

=== Rolling stock ===
The Airport Express is served by 11 CAF-Stock trains built and assembled by Construcciones y Auxiliar de Ferrocarriles in Spain while Adtranz contributed control and traction equipment. These trains were made up of seven cars (six passenger cars and a luggage car) until 2005. To cope with the extra traffic demand derived from the opening of AsiaWorld-Expo station, an additional passenger car was added to each train to form a total of eight cars (seven passenger cars and a luggage car). If future demand increases, trains are ultimately capable of running with ten cars (nine passenger cars and a luggage car). In service, the trains operate at a maximum speed of 135 km/h (84 mph), however they are designed to travel at a maximum speed of 140 km/h (89 mph).

The train interiors saw their first refurbishment in 2008, after ten years in service. The grey seat covers were replaced with purple and green ones, and a new indigo carpet was installed. The interior was updated yet again in 2020, and new seat covers featuring the blue and aquamarine AEL logos and a grey wave pattern will be paired with synthetic leather head rests.

== Stations ==
This is a list of the stations on the Airport Express line.

List

Livery	Station Name		Images	Interchange; Adjacent transportation	Opening	District
Livery	English	Chinese	Images	Interchange; Adjacent transportation	Opening	District
Airport Express Line (AEL)
	Hong Kong	香港		Tung Chung line Tsuen Wan line (Central); Island line (Central)	6 July 1998; 28 years ago	Central and Western
	Kowloon	九龍		Tung Chung line Tuen Ma line (Austin); Hong Kong West Kowloon: High-speed rail services to Mainland China	6 July 1998; 28 years ago	Yau Tsim Mong
	Tsing Yi	青衣		Tung Chung line	6 July 1998; 28 years ago	Kwai Tsing
	Airport	機場		Hong Kong International Airport	6 July 1998; 28 years ago	Islands
	AsiaWorld–Expo	博覽館		—	20 December 2005; 20 years ago	Islands

== Design limitations ==
When British Hong Kong was planning to build the Airport Railway (Tung Chung line and Airport Express) in the 1990s, a few years before the planned handover to China, the Chinese government raised concerns about the effect of the project on the territory's fiscal reserves, which eventually forced the (British) Hong Kong government to reduce the cost of the Airport Railway. The resulting changes made imposed design limitations on the level of service on the line.

- The airport rail link was originally designed to accommodate four tracks, two each for the Airport Express and Tung Chung line. It was later reduced to two tracks where both services share the same trackage. As a result, signal failures can affect both services.
- The Lantau Link section of the line (consisting of the Tsing Ma Bridge, Ma Wan Viaduct, and Kap Shui Mun Bridge) only allows one train to pass through each direction at the same time, raising the minimum headway between trains to 2 minutes 15 seconds.
- The signalling system is not capable of giving priority to Airport Express trains; as a result, Tung Chung line trains stopping at Sunny Bay station sometimes impede Airport Express trains, which do not serve the station.
- The power supply system restricts the number of trains running between Kowloon and Lai King stations. The system can accommodate a maximum of one Airport Express train and two Tung Chung trains travelling in both directions at one time. The minimum headway on this section of the line is 3 minutes 30 seconds.

== See also ==
- List of places in Hong Kong
- Transport in Hong Kong
- Delhi Airport Metro Express
- Hyderabad Airport Express Metro
