= Tung Chung line =

Hong Kong MTR railway line

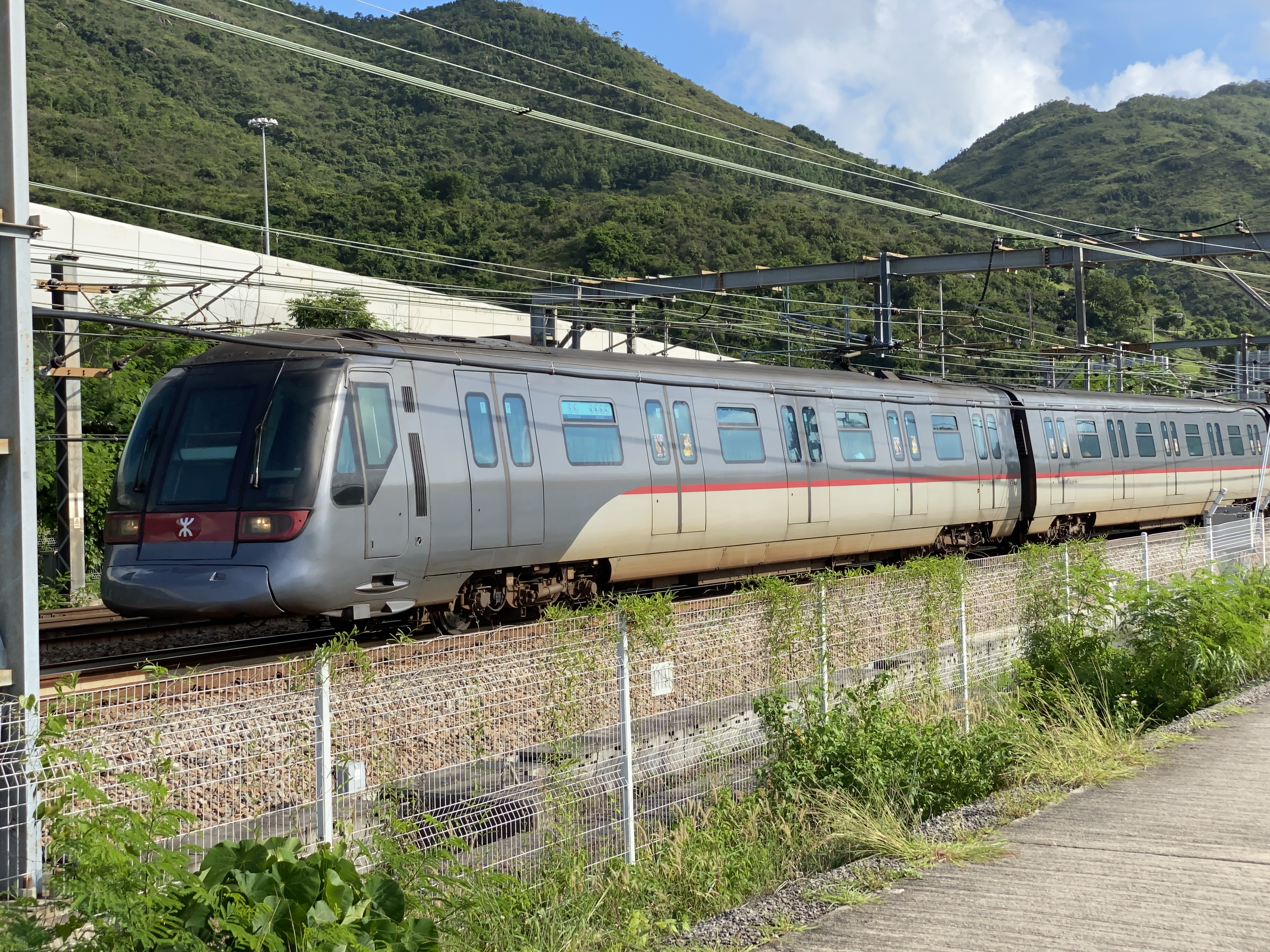
- A Tung Chung line CAF–train approaching Sunny Bay station, bound for Hong Kong

Overview
- Native name: 東涌綫
- Status: Operational
- Owner: MTR Corporation
- Locale: Districts: Islands, Tsuen Wan, Kwai Tsing, Sham Shui Po, Yau Tsim Mong, Central & Western
- Termini: Tung Chung; Hong Kong
- Connecting lines: Airport Express Via Hong Kong, Kowloon, Tsing Yi; Disneyland Resort line Via Sunny Bay; Tsuen Wan line Via Lai King, Hong Kong-Central; Tuen Ma line Via Nam Cheong; Island line Via Hong Kong-Central
- Former connections: West Rail line
- Stations: 11 (8 in operation)
- Color on map: Orange (#F7943E)

Service
- Type: Rapid transit / Commuter rail
- System: MTR
- Operator: MTR Corporation
- Depot: Siu Ho Wan
- Rolling stock: Adtranz–CAF EMU; Rotem EMU
- Ridership: 236,900 daily average (weekdays, September 2014)

History
- Work began: November 1994; 31 years ago
- Opened: 22 June 1998; 28 years ago

Technical
- Line length: 31.1 km (19.3 mi)
- Number of tracks: Double-track (shares tracks with Airport Express from Tung Chung to Tsing Yi and Kowloon to Hong Kong); Quadruple-track (separate tracks from Airport Express from Tsing Yi to Kowloon)
- Track gauge: 1,432 mm (4 ft 8 3/8 in)
- Electrification: 1.5 kV DC (Overhead line)
- Operating speed: 135 km/h (84 mph): Maximum: 140 km/h (87 mph)
- Signalling: Advanced SelTrac CBTC (future)
- Train protection system: SACEM (to be replaced)
Route map

Tung Chung line
- Traditional Chinese: 東涌綫
- Simplified Chinese: 东涌线
- Literal meaning: East (of a) branch of a river line
Transcriptions
Standard Mandarin
- Hanyu Pinyin: Dōngchōng xiàn
Yue: Cantonese
- Yale Romanization: dūng chūng sin
- Jyutping: dung1 cung1 sin3

The Tung Chung line (Chinese: 東涌綫) is one of the ten lines of the MTR system in Hong Kong, linking the town of Tung Chung with central Hong Kong. It was built in the 1990s as part of a railway project to support the new Chek Lap Kok Airport. The line currently travels through eight stations in 31 minutes along its route.

== History ==
In October 1989, the Hong Kong government announced plans to build a new airport on the island of Chek Lap Kok to replace the overcrowded Kai Tak International Airport in the heart of Kowloon.

As part of the initiative, the government invited the MTR Corporation to build a rail link to the new airport. The project initially saw opposition from the Chinese government as it feared the construction would drain the fiscal reserves of the Hong Kong government and leave the Chinese with nothing after the British handed the territory over in 1997.

Both the Chinese and British governments reached an agreement and construction commenced in November 1994. The line was originally named Lantau line but was later renamed Tung Chung line during the construction.

The Lantau Airport rail link consists of two train lines, the Tung Chung line and the Airport Express. Both lines deploy the same rolling stock but with differences around interior fittings and liveries. The Lantau Airport Railway had consultants such as Arup, Halcrow, Meinhardt, Hyder Consulting, and others, at the time of the construction.

On 22 June 1998, the Tung Chung line was officially opened by Chief Executive Tung Chee-hwa, and service commenced the next day.

On 16 December 2003, an open house for charity took place at the recently completed Nam Cheong station, an interchange between the Tung Chung line and soon-to-be-opened West Rail line. The station then closed on 19 December 2003 in preparation for the opening of the new KCR West Rail, and it was officially opened to public on 20 December 2003. Since then, the number of cars per train has increased from seven to eight to accommodate the additional patronage.

Sunny Bay station opened on 1 June 2005 as an interchange for the Disneyland Resort line. The resort opened its doors two months after the station became operational.

Between 2006 and 2007, four brand new Korean Rotem EMU trains entered service to increase service frequency. The first train was delivered on 9 February 2006 and entered service on 12 June 2006. Modifications were added to the platforms to accommodate the new trains, which are a few millimetres wider than the original rolling stock.

== Route map ==
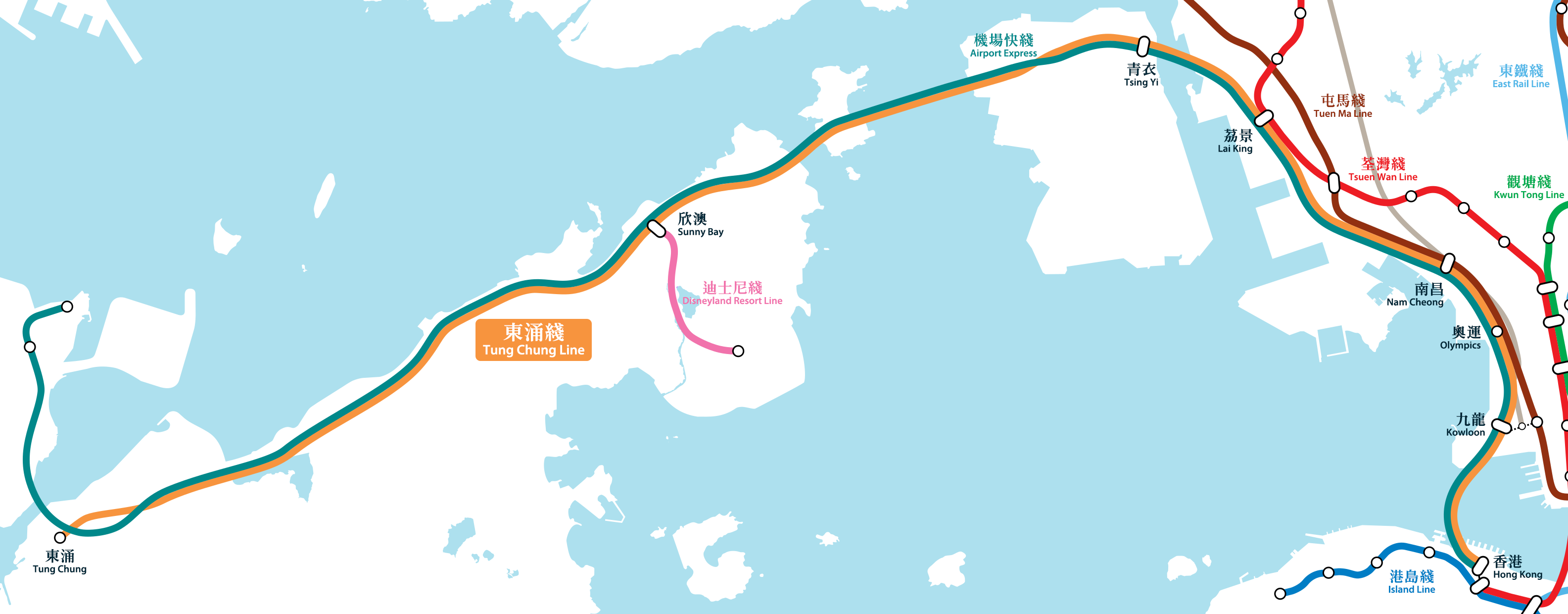
MTR Tung Chung line, Airport Express, and Disneyland Resort line route map

== Rolling stock ==
MTR Tung Chung line Rolling stock
| Model | Manufacturer | Time of manufacturing | Sets | Formation |
|---|---|---|---|---|
| CAF-Train | Adtranz and CAF | 1996–1997 | 12 | V-W-X-Y-W-X-Z-V |
| K-Train | Hyundai Rotem and Mitsubishi Heavy Industries | 2004–2005 | 4 | V-Z-X-Y-W-X-Z-V |
| LAR Q-Train (future) | CRRC Qingdao Sifang | 2025-current | 24 | V-Z-X-Y-W-X-Z-V |

== Route description ==
Unlike most other railway lines in the system, the Tung Chung line travels mostly above ground and spans a greater distance. The line shares its trackage with the Airport Express between Kowloon and Hong Kong, Tsing Yi and Tung Chung East and before diverging right before Tung Chung station.

The line travels underground from Hong Kong station to Kowloon station across Victoria Harbour, then surfaces to the ground to reach Olympic station. Trains continue to travel above ground along the West Kowloon Expressway and stop at Nam Cheong station, followed by Lai King station on a viaduct. Thereafter, the line crosses the Rambler Channel and stops at Tsing Yi station on Tsing Yi Island.

Trains then enter a tunnel through the hills of the island and continues on the Tsing Ma Bridge and the Kap Shui Mun Bridge onto Lantau Island. The line continues along the North Lantau Expressway and stops at Sunny Bay before terminating at Tung Chung. The distance between the two stops is roughly 10 km (6.2 mi) and takes approximately 6 minutes to complete.

Some outbound peak trains do not continue to Lantau but terminate at Tsing Yi station instead due to less passengers continuing towards Tung Chung and the capacity constraint of the Tsing Ma Bridge which only allows one train per track every two and a half minutes.

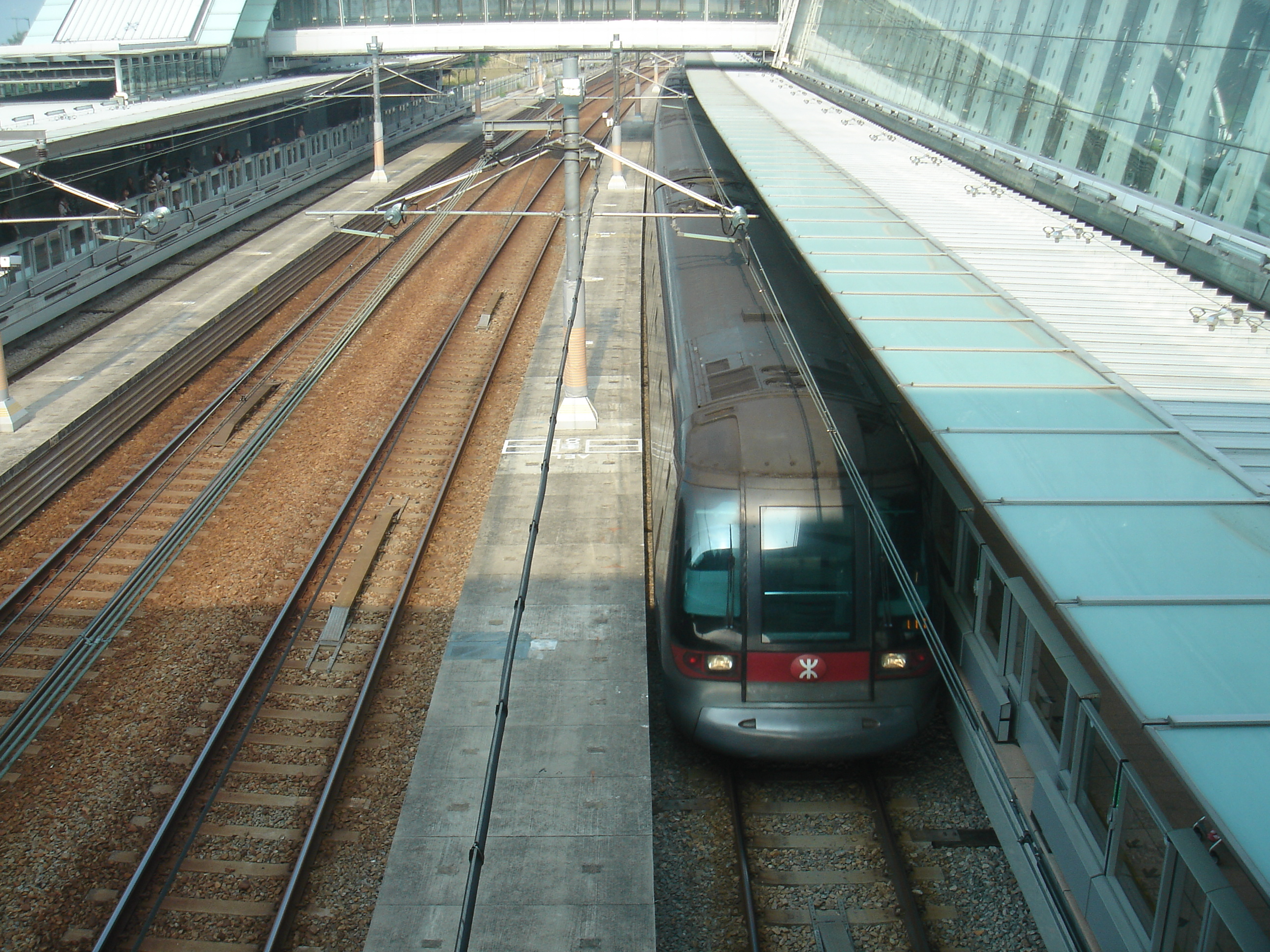
A Tung Chung line CAF-train at Sunny Bay station viewed from a footbridge

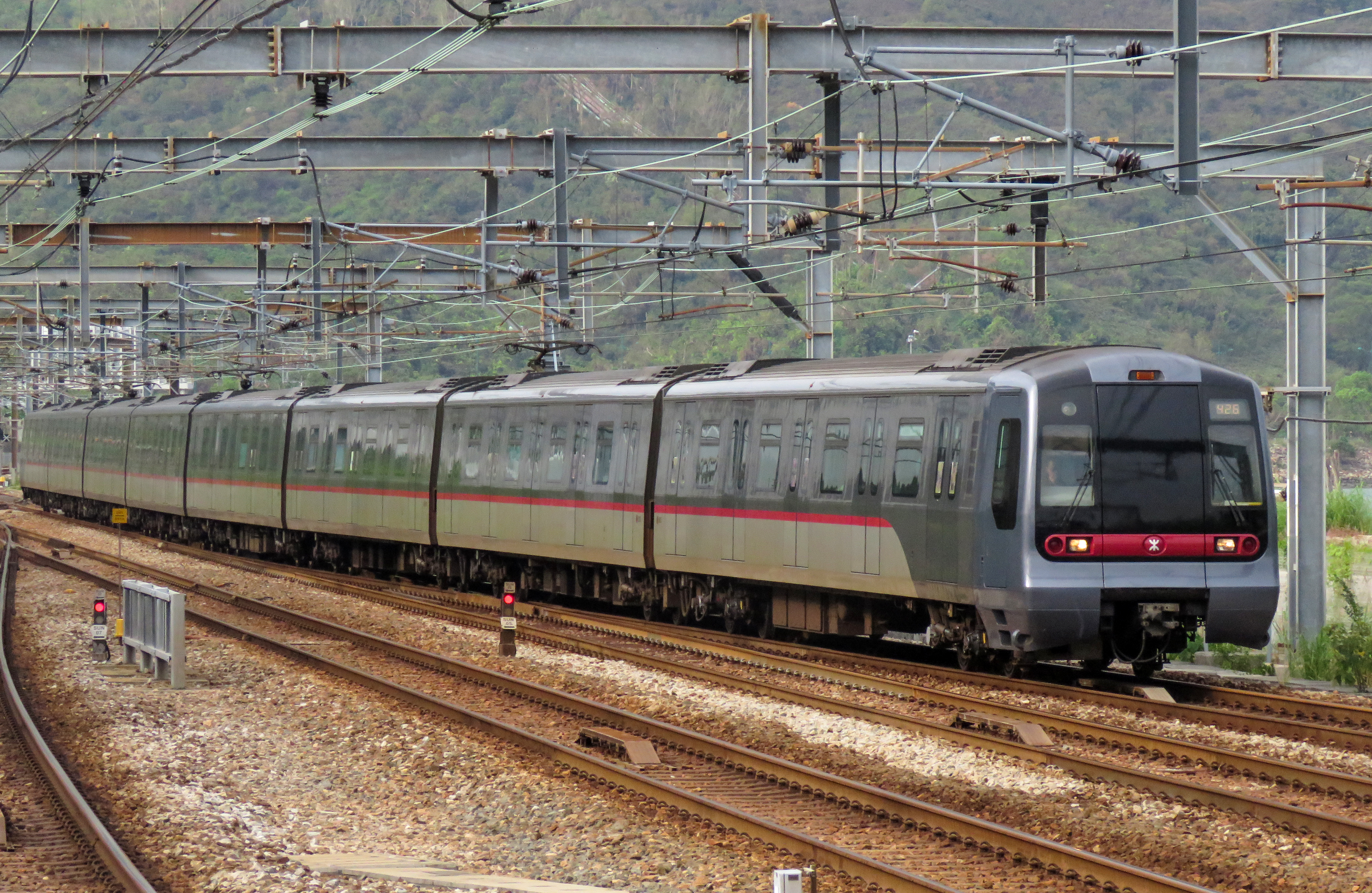
A Tung Chung line K-train approaching Sunny Bay station, bound for Hong Kong

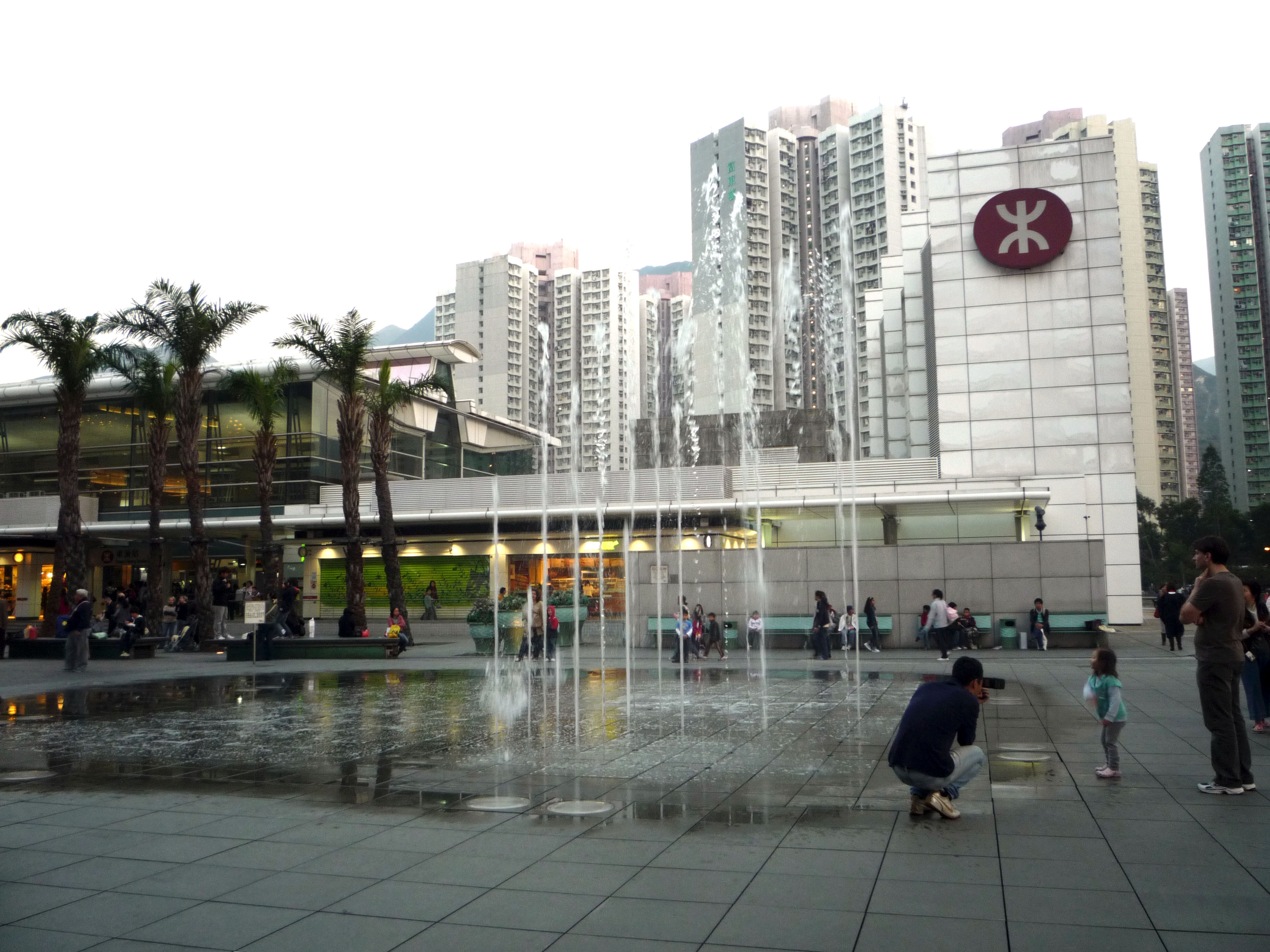
Exterior of Tung Chung station

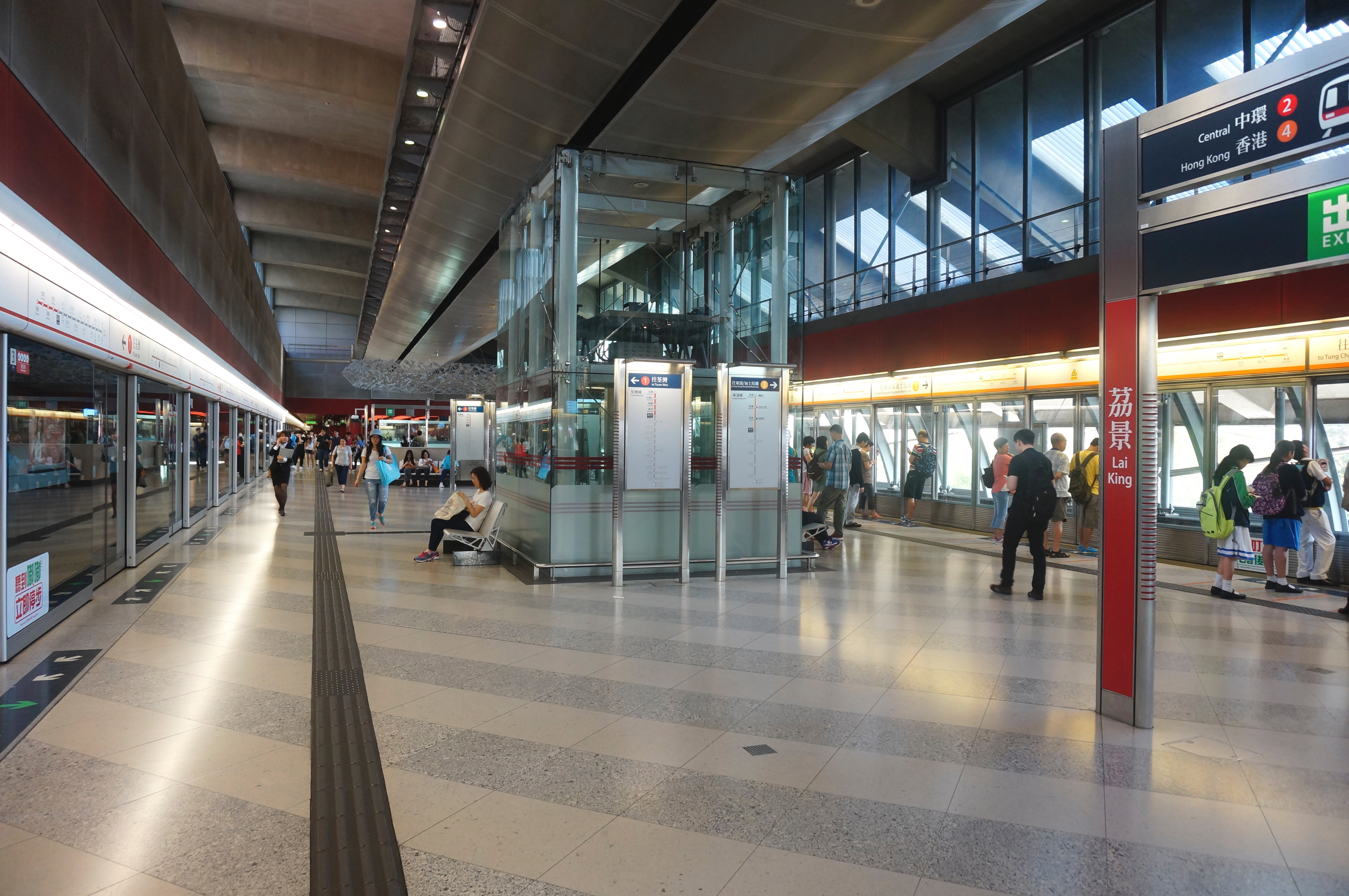
Upper platform level of Lai King station
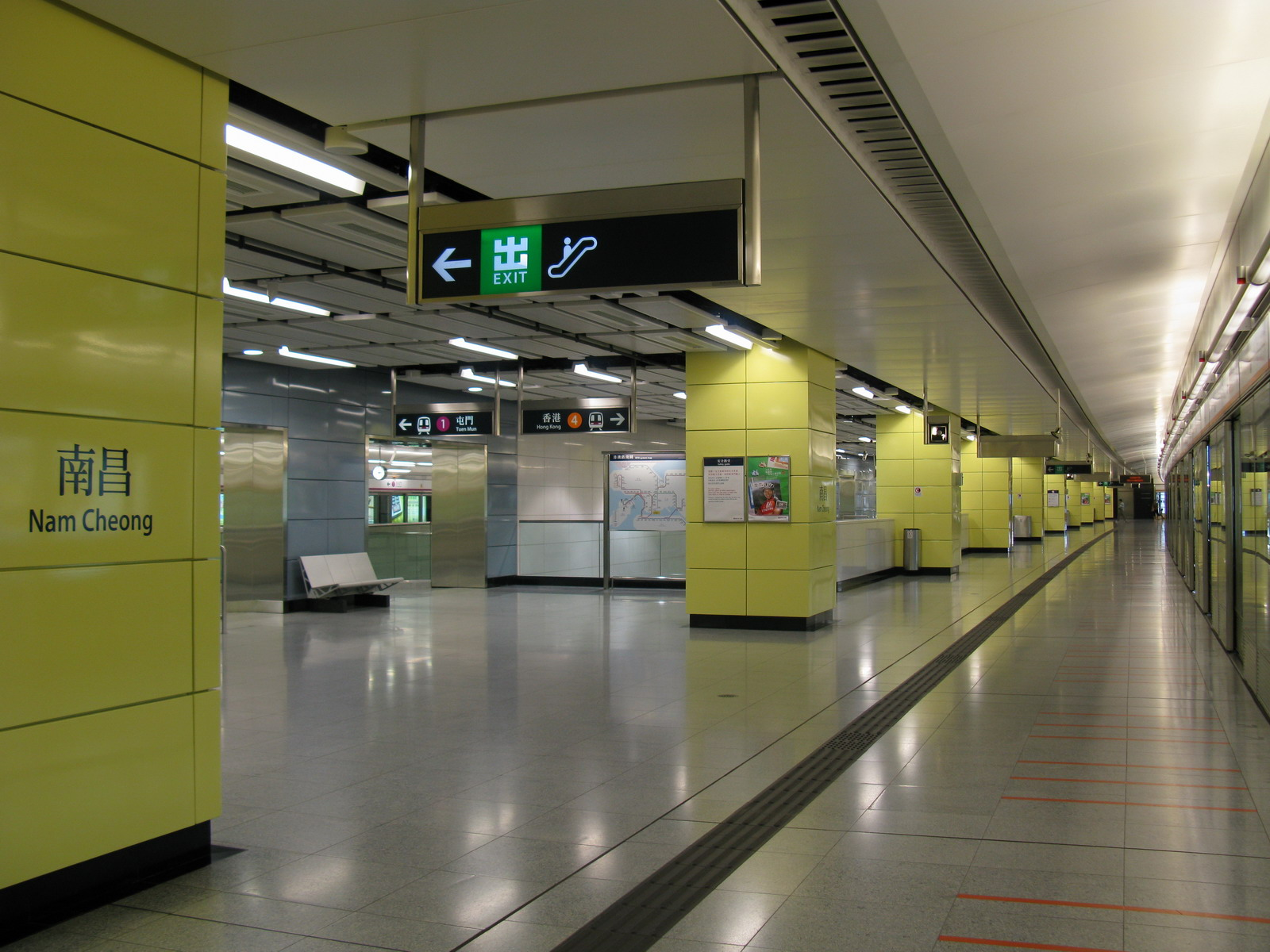
Nam Cheong station; an interchange with Tuen Ma Line

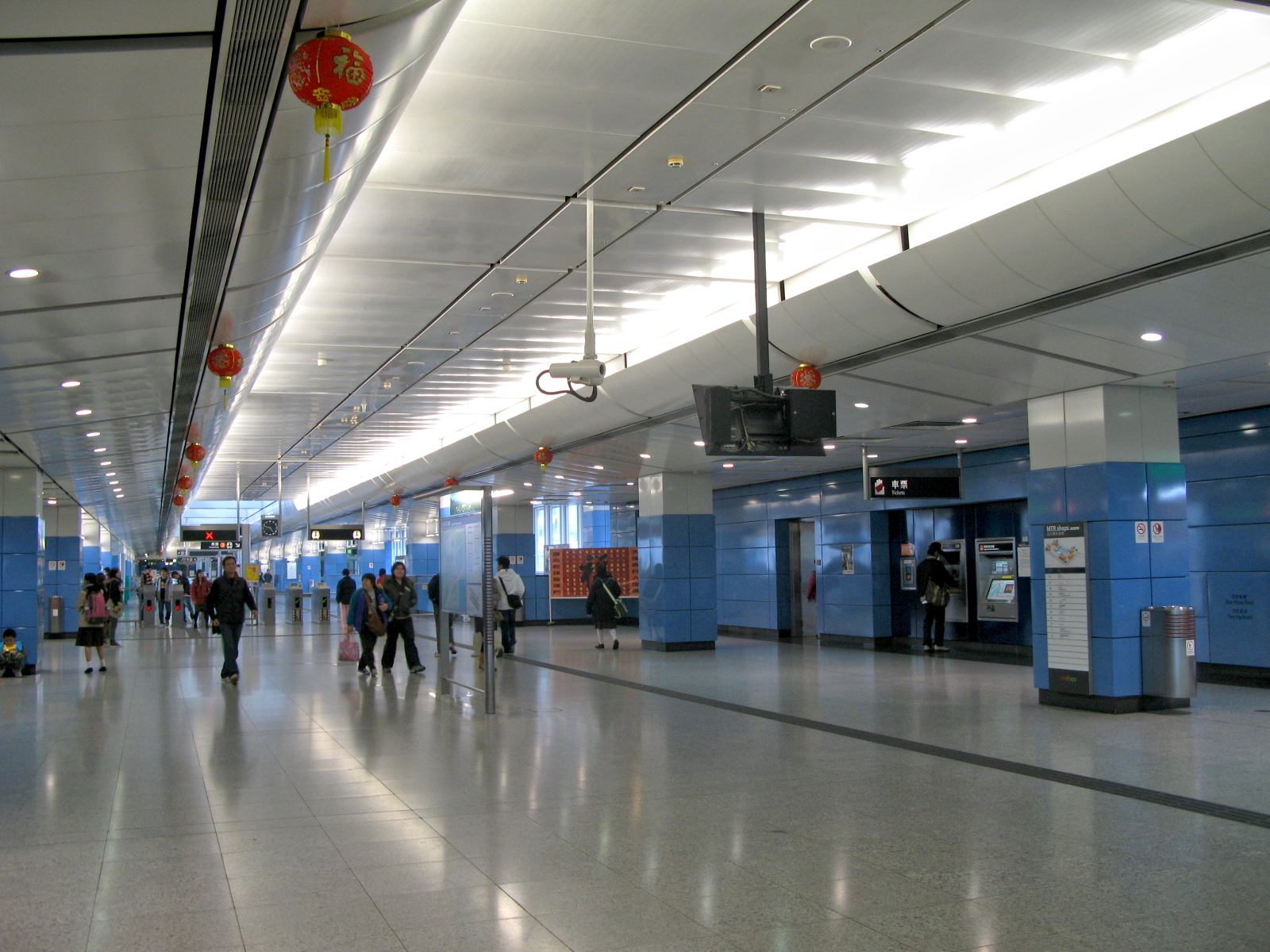
Olympic station concourse

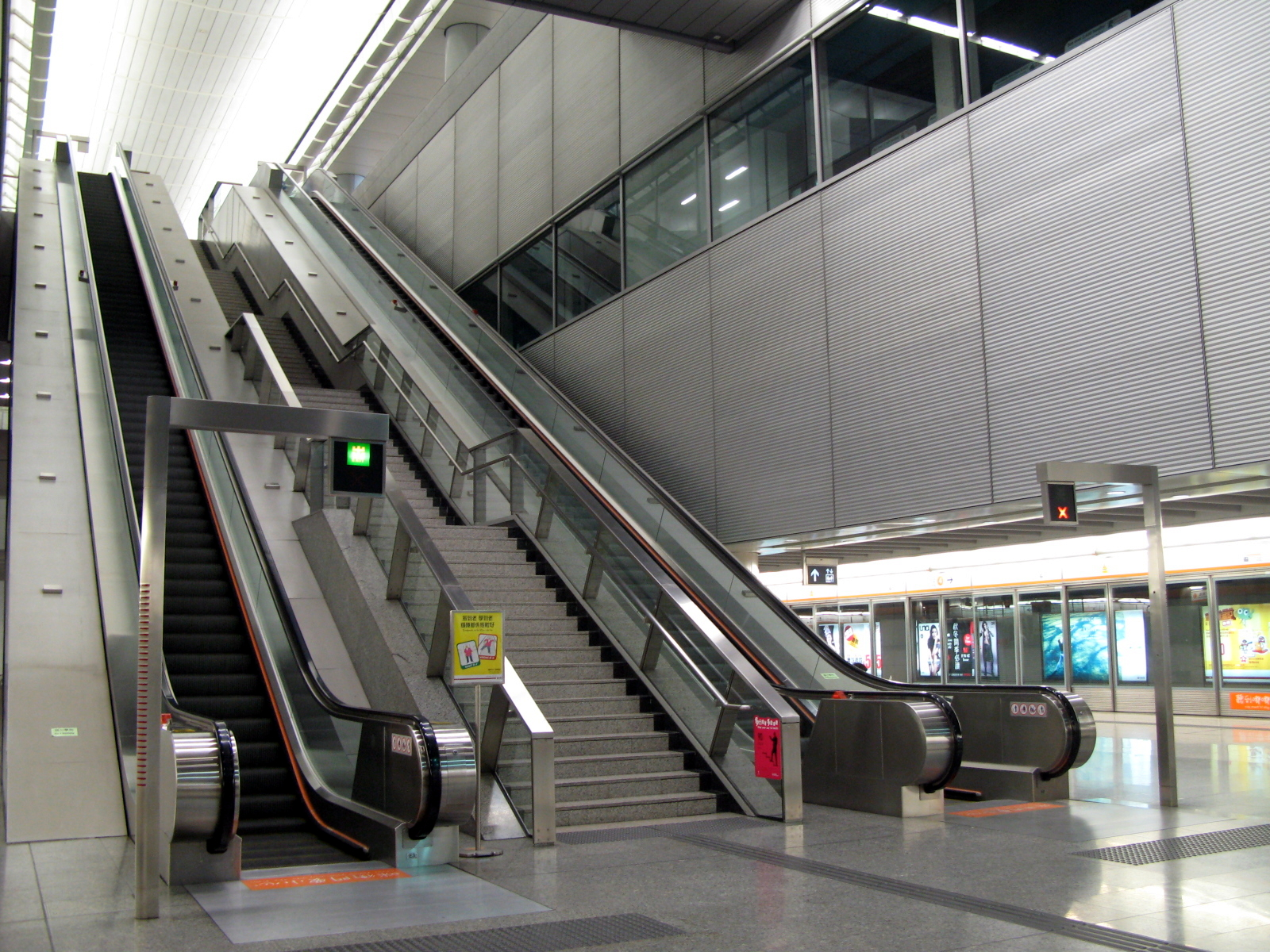
Kowloon station, Tung Chung line platform

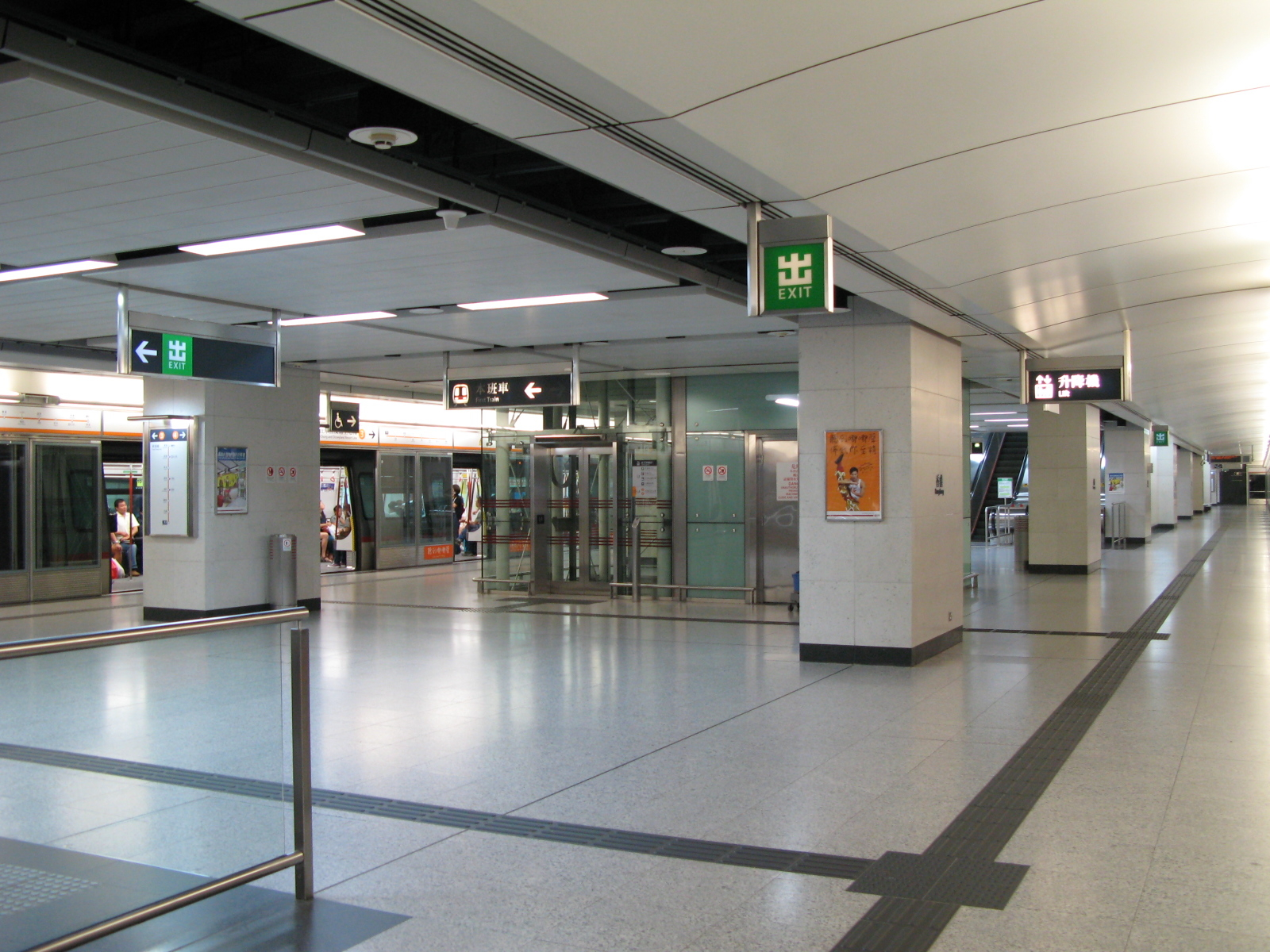
Hong Kong station, Tung Chung line platform

== Stations ==
This is a list of the stations on the Tung Chung line.

List

| Livery | Station Name | | Images | Interchange; Adjacent transportation | Opening | District |
| Livery | English | Chinese | Images | Interchange; Adjacent transportation | Opening | District |
|---|---|---|---|---|---|---|
Tung Chung Line (TCL)
| | Hong Kong | 香港 | | Airport Express Central: Tsuen Wan line Island line | 22 June 1998; 28 years ago | Central and Western |
| | Kowloon | 九龍 | | Airport Express Austin: Tuen Ma line West Kowloon: High-speed rail services to Mainland China | 22 June 1998; 28 years ago | Yau Tsim Mong |
| | Olympic | 奧運 | | — | 22 June 1998; 28 years ago | Yau Tsim Mong |
| | Nam Cheong | 南昌 | | Tuen Ma line | 20 December 2003; 22 years ago | Sham Shui Po |
| | Lai King | 茘景 | | Tsuen Wan line | 22 June 1998; 28 years ago | Kwai Tsing |
| | Tsing Yi | 青衣 | | Airport Express | 22 June 1998; 28 years ago | Kwai Tsing |
| | Sunny Bay | 欣澳 | | Disneyland Resort line | 1 June 2005; 21 years ago | Tsuen Wan |
| | Oyster Bay | 小蠔灣 | | — | 2030; 4 years' time | Islands |
| | Tung Chung East | 東涌東 | | — | 2029; 3 years' time | Islands |
| | Tung Chung | 東涌 | | Ngong Ping Cable Car | 22 June 1998; 28 years ago | Islands |
| | Tung Chung West | 東涌西 | | — | 2029; 3 years' time | Islands |

Stations with names in italic are under construction

== Design limitations ==
When British Hong Kong was planning to build the Airport Railway (Tung Chung line and Airport Express) in the 1990s, which was a few years before the handover to China, the Chinese government raised concerns about the effect of the project on the territory's fiscal reserves, which eventually forced the Hong Kong government to reduce the cost of the Airport Railway. The resulting changes made to the design imposed limitations on the level of service on the line.

- The airport rail link was originally designed to accommodate four tracks, two each for the Airport Express and Tung Chung line. It was later reduced to two tracks where both services share the same trackage in some sections. As a result, signal failures can affect both services.
- The Lantau Link section of the line (consisting of the Tsing Ma Bridge, Ma Wan Viaduct, and Kap Shui Mun Bridge) only allows one train to pass through each direction at the same time, raising the minimum headway between trains to 2 minutes 15 seconds. As a result, some Tung Chung line trains terminate at Tsing Yi during peak hours, instead of travelling the entire line.
- The signalling system is not capable of giving priority to Airport Express trains; as a result, Tung Chung line trains stopping at Sunny Bay station sometimes impede Airport Express trains, which do not serve the station. Tung Chung Line trains would sometimes stop at Sunny Bay Station for an extended period of time to give way to the Airport Express trains.
- The power supply system restricts the number of trains running between Kowloon and Lai King stations. The system can accommodate a maximum of one Airport Express train and two Tung Chung trains travelling in both directions at one time. The minimum headway on this section of the line is 3 minutes 30 seconds.

== Future development ==
=== Extension in Tung Chung ===
==== Tung Chung line extension ====
In the Railway Development Strategy 2014, it was proposed that the Tung Chung Line be extended west and a new station constructed at Tung Chung West.

In April 2020, Carrie Lam and the Executive Council approved the detailed planning and design of the Tung Chung line extension project consisting of two new stations. Construction began in May 2023, with the cost of the two new stations expected to be HK$24.2 billion in 2023. Tung Chung East is an infill station between Tung Chung and Sunny Bay, while Tung Chung West would be a new underground station west of Tung Chung and serve as the new terminus of the Tung Chung Line. This extension is expected to be complete by 2029. The project is will extend the line by an additional 1.3 kilometres. The design contract for the extension was awarded to British engineering companies Arup and Atkins in June 2021.

=== Extensions on Hong Kong Island ===
==== Airport Railway Extended Overrun Tunnel (AREOT) ====
An underground tunnel, around half a kilometer long, will be built eastwards of Hong Kong station. It will allow Tung Chung line and Airport Express trains to turn around so trains can easily switch directions and enhance operational efficiency. This project would also include the construction of a new ventilation building, ARB. Construction is expected to begin in 2025 and to be completed by 2032.

==== North Island line ====
Once the North Island line is complete, trains will travel in a tunnel east of Hong Kong station along the shore of the island before reaching Tamar, also connecting with the Tseung Kwan O line as an interchange. Three new stations – Tamar, Exhibition Centre and Causeway Bay North will form part of the extension. As of 2025, the government has stated that the extension isn't of high demand, and will not be completed before 2046.

=== Turnbacks on the Tung Chung Line ===
There are several turnbacks on the Tung Chung line, some shared with the Airport express. Hong Kong station has a turnback, like most terminus stations. The turnback is not shared with the Airport express, as it has its own turnback. Kowloon station has a turnback and it is also not shared with the Tung Chung line. The turnback is mostly used for trains from Hong Kong station terminating at Kowloon, when there is a Typhoon level 9 or above. Tsing Yi has two turnbacks, one only for the Tung Chung line and one, less used, shared between the two lines. The one only for the Tung Chung line is sometimes used at peak hours, when trains terminate at Tsing Yi. There is a turnback at Sunny Bay, which is shared with the Airport Express. It was used when the MTR was completing works at Tung Chung East station. Tung Chung station has a turnback, like most terminus stations.

== See also ==
- List of places in Hong Kong
- Transport in Hong Kong
