= Tsing Yi station =

Metro interchange station in Hong Kong

Tsing Yi 青衣
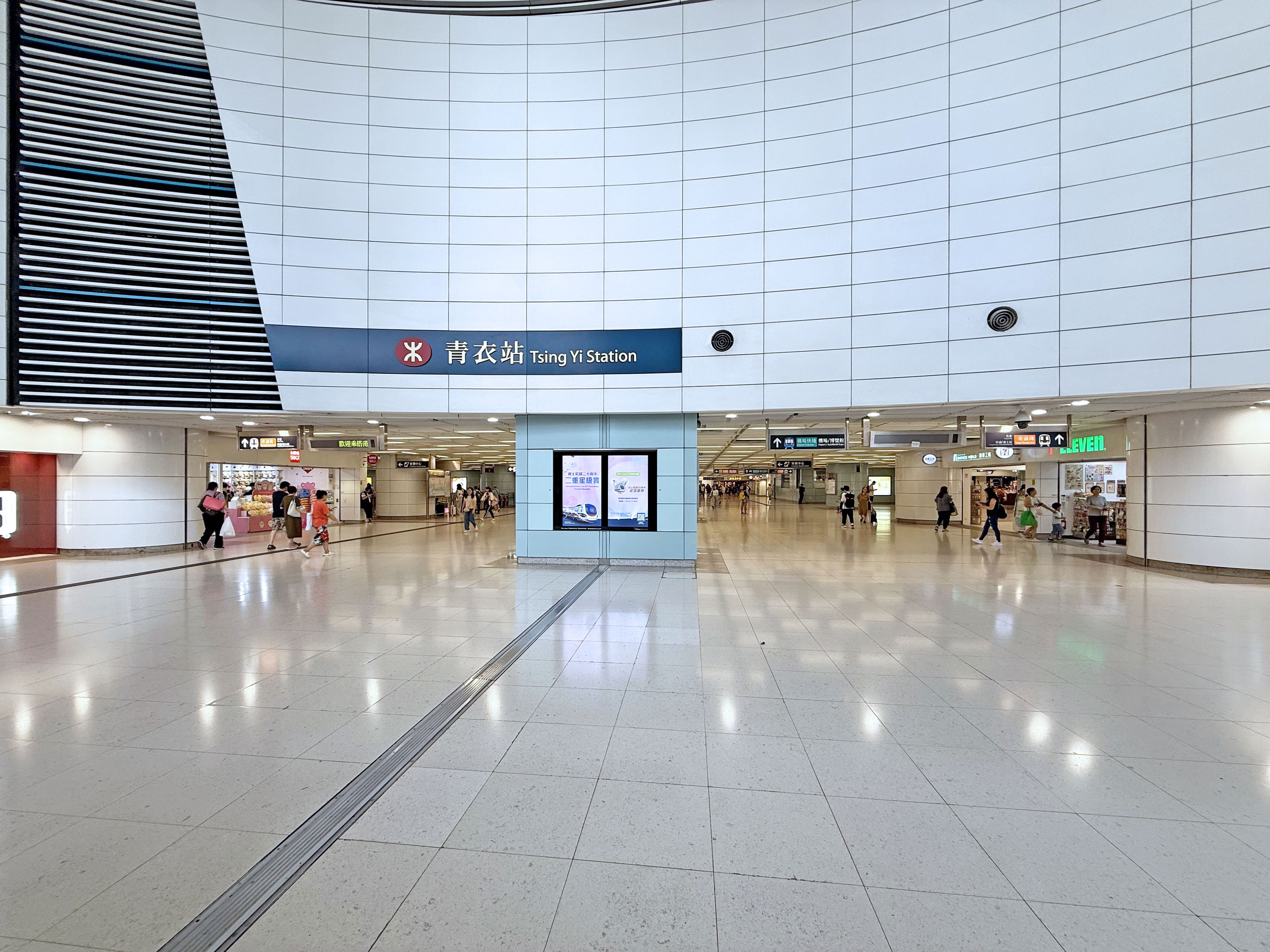
- Entrance A of Tsing Yi Station in August 2025

Chinese name
- Chinese: 青衣
- Cantonese Yale: Chīngyī
- Literal meaning: Cyan Clothes
Transcriptions
Standard Mandarin
- Hanyu Pinyin: Qīngyī
Yue: Cantonese
- Yale Romanization: Chīngyī
- Jyutping: Cing1ji1

General information
- Location: Tierra Verde, Tsing King Road, Tsing Yi; Kwai Tsing District, Hong Kong
- Coordinates: 22°21′30″N 114°06′25″E
- System: MTR rapid transit station
- Owner: MTR Corporation
- Operator: MTR Corporation
- Lines: Tung Chung line; Airport Express
- Platforms: 4 (4 side platforms)
- Tracks: 4
- Connections: Bus, minibus

Construction
- Structure type: Elevated
- Platform levels: 2
- Accessible: Yes
- Architect: Wong Tung & Partners

Other information
- Station code: TSY

History
- Opened: 22 June 1998; 28 years ago (Tung Chung line); 6 July 1998; 28 years ago (Airport Express)

Services
Preceding station	MTR	Following station
Kowloon towards Hong Kong	Airport Express	Airport towards Airport or AsiaWorld–Expo
Lai King towards Hong Kong	Tung Chung line	Sunny Bay towards Tung Chung
Track layout
Location
- Location within MTR

Tsing Yi is an interchange station of the MTR between the Tung Chung line and the Airport Express on Tsing Yi Island in Hong Kong. The station is located between Sunny Bay station and Lai King station on the Tung Chung Line, and between Airport station and Kowloon station on the Airport Express. The station’s colour scheme on the Tung Chung line platforms is dull teal, and Foster grey on the Airport Express platforms. Tsing Yi station is connected to a major interchange for buses and maxicabs, situated adjacent to the station, which serves as a public transport hub for the New Territories. It is located within the Maritime Square shopping centre.

== History ==
The station, built as part of the Lantau Airport Railway project, was constructed between December 1994 and March 1998 by Japanese contractor Maeda Corporation.

Tsing Yi station opened together with the Tung Chung Line on 22 June 1998. The Airport Express services commenced at the station two weeks later on 6 July.

== Location ==
Tsing Yi station is located in the northeastern quarter of the island of the same name, slightly to the west of Kowloon and mainland Hong Kong. To the west is Tsing Yi Town Park, while the Tsing Yi Sports Ground lies to the south. Otherwise, much of the area is residential with a number of educational establishments nearby.

=== Transit-oriented development ===
As with other MTR stations, Tsing Yi is a prime site for transit-oriented development by the MTR Corporation, whose properties division develops land above and in the vicinity of its stations. Owing to its ideal location between Kowloon and Lantau Island, MTR Properties has heavily invested in commercial and residential development around Tsing Yi, the most prominent of this investment being Maritime Square, a large shopping centre extending from the station, and the residential estate Tierra Verde, which lies on top of the station. Maritime Square contains 46,170 m^{2} (497,000 sq ft) of retail space, while the Tierra Verde complex comprises twelve residential towers and a total of 3,500 flats.

== Airport Express service ==
The MTR offers Airport Express services to allow passengers to take the Airport Express from Tsing Yi to Hong Kong station. Passengers can access this service by using their Octopus card at dedicated gates for HK$25. This offer is available daily from 7 am to 10 am except on Sundays and public holidays.

== Station layout ==
The station has four storeys above ground level. The ground floor has a taxi stand outside and has access to the concourse on the first floor. The concourse is integrated with the Maritime Square shopping centre. The second level houses the Tung Chung line platform for trains heading for Hong Kong station, and the third floor houses the Tung Chung line platform for services towards Tung Chung station. At the Airport Express departure and arrival platforms, there is a free WiFi hotspot available. Unlike at Kowloon and Hong Kong stations, in-town check-in facilities and free Airport Express shuttle buses are not available at this station.

The Airport Express and Tung Chung line platforms are separated with a different paid area for both. Passengers changing between two lines must go downstairs and past through floor U1, and then go upstairs again. In Tsing Yi station, the four platforms are constructed in a stacked arrangement, with platforms 1 and 3 above platforms 2 and 4 below. Platform 2 is only used by passengers coming from Hong Kong International Airport or AsiaWorld–Expo to disembark, except between 7 am and 10 am on Mondays to Saturdays, when Morning Express services are available.

U6; Car park	Car park	Tsing Yi station car park
U4; Upper Platforms (Exit F)	Upper exits	Exit F, Maritime Square, customer service
U4; Upper Platforms (Exit F)	Upper exits	Automatic teller machines
U4; Upper Platforms (Exit F)	Side platform, doors will open on the right
U4; Upper Platforms (Exit F)	Platform 3	← Tung Chung line towards Tung Chung (Sunny Bay)
U4; Upper Platforms (Exit F)	Platform 1	← Airport Express towards AsiaWorld–Expo (Airport)
U4; Upper Platforms (Exit F)	Side platform, doors will open on the left
U4; Upper Platforms (Exit F)	Airport Express concourse	Customer service, toilets
U4; Upper Platforms (Exit F)	Airport Express concourse	Drop-off area, MTR shops, automatic teller machines
U3; Mezzanine		Mezzanine floor (not open to public)
U2; Lower Platforms (Exit G)	Lower exits	Exit G, Maritime Square, self-service point, MTR shops
U2; Lower Platforms (Exit G)	Side platform, doors will open on the left
U2; Lower Platforms (Exit G)	Platform 4	Tung Chung line towards Hong Kong (Lai King) →
U2; Lower Platforms (Exit G)	Platform 2	Airport Express towards Hong Kong (Kowloon)→
U2; Lower Platforms (Exit G)	Side platform, doors will open on the right
U2; Lower Platforms (Exit G)	Airport Express concourse	Customer service, toilets
U2; Lower Platforms (Exit G)	Airport Express concourse	Taxi stand, MTR shops, automatic teller machines
U1	Tung Chung line concourse	Exits, transport interchange, customer service
U1	Tung Chung line concourse	Maritime Square, MTR shops, Hang Seng Bank
G	Ground Exit	Exit C, drop-off area, MTR shops

== Entrances and exits ==
- A1: Maritime Square 2
- A2: Tierra Verde/Maritime Square (Level 1)
- B: Tsing Yi Swimming Pool
- C: Public Transport Interchange/Tsing King Road
- F: Maritime Square (Level 3)
- G: Maritime Square (Level 2)

== Gallery ==
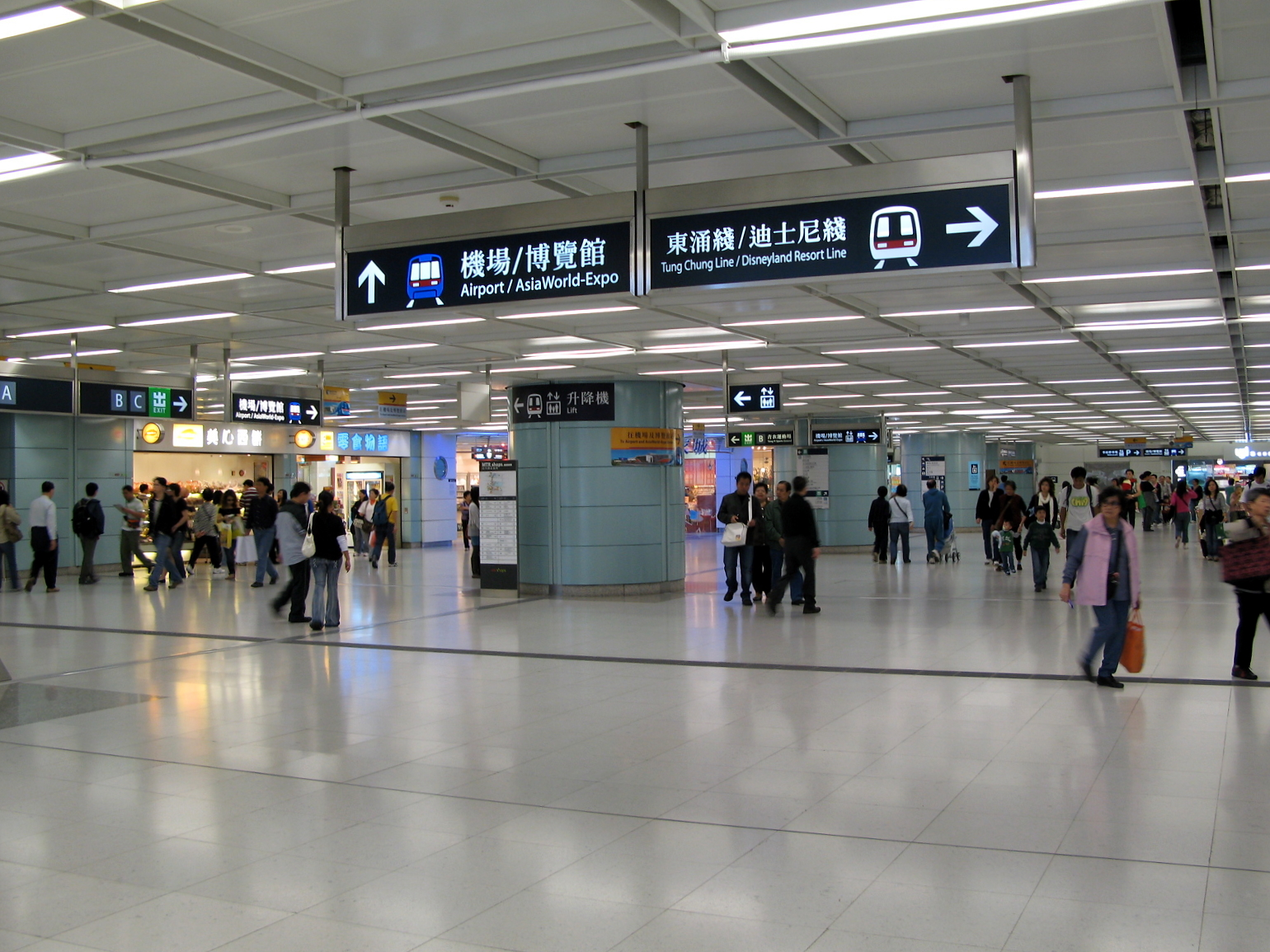
Tsing Yi station concourse

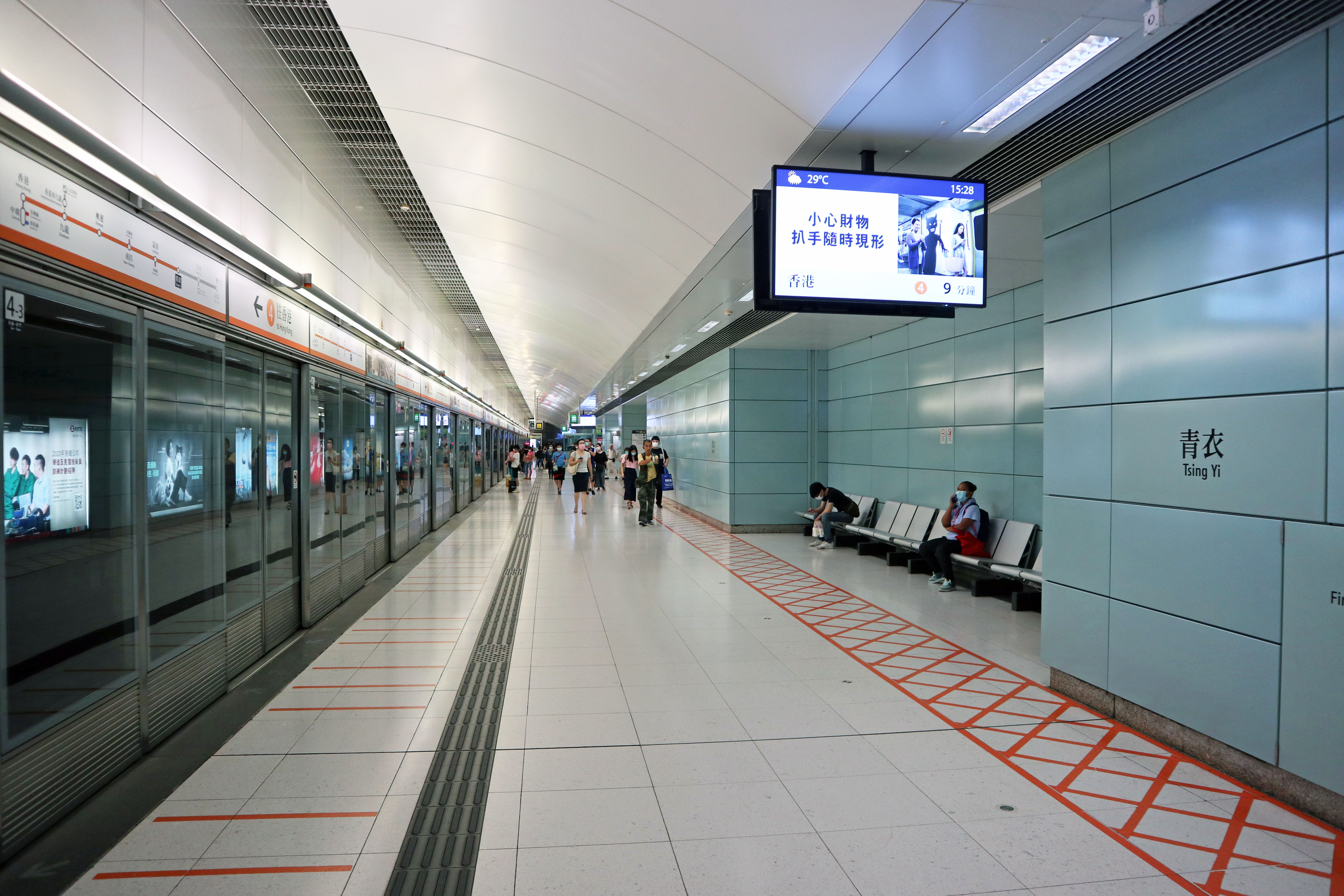
Tsing Yi station Tung Chung line platform

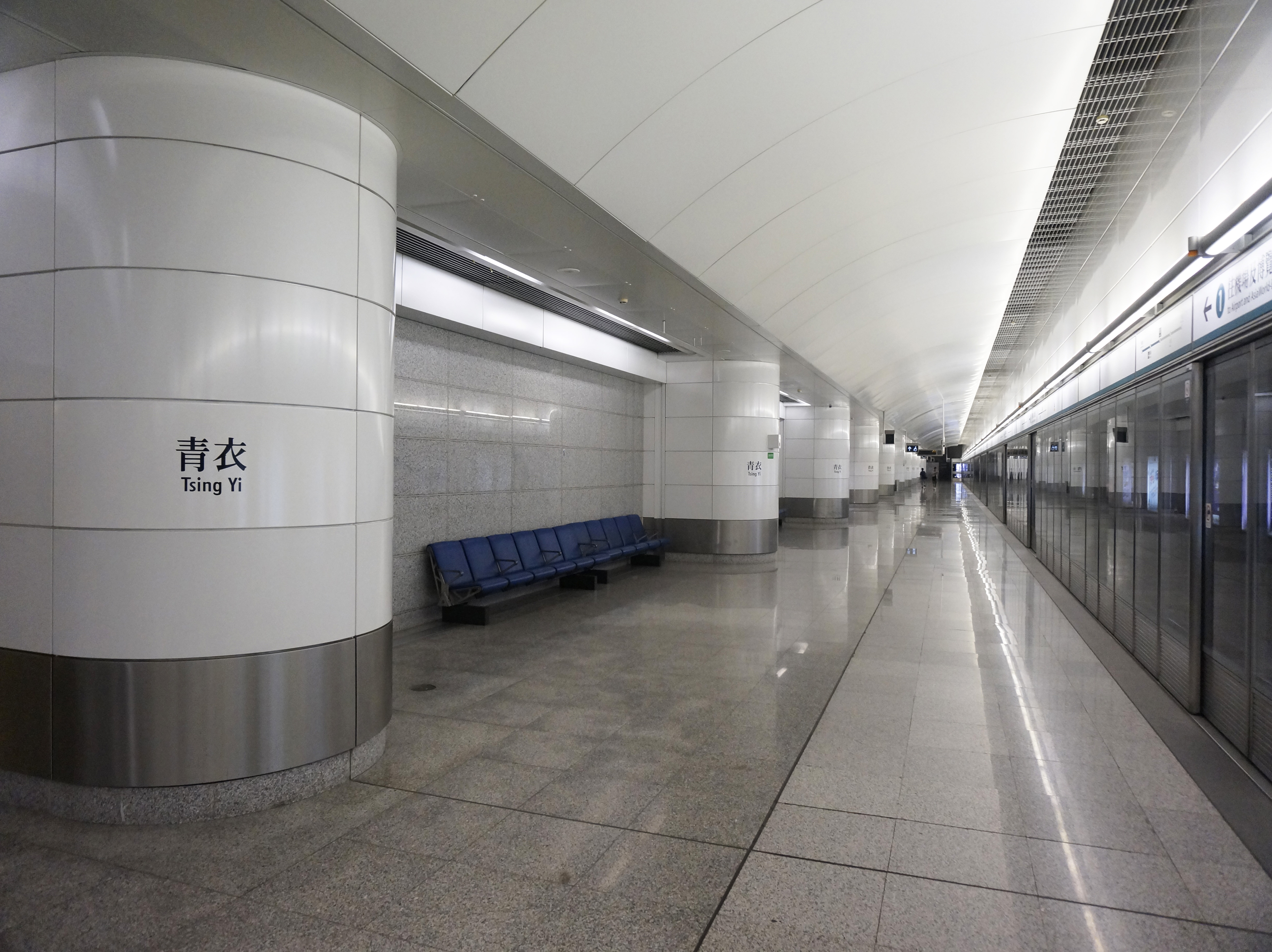
Tsing Yi station Airport Express platform

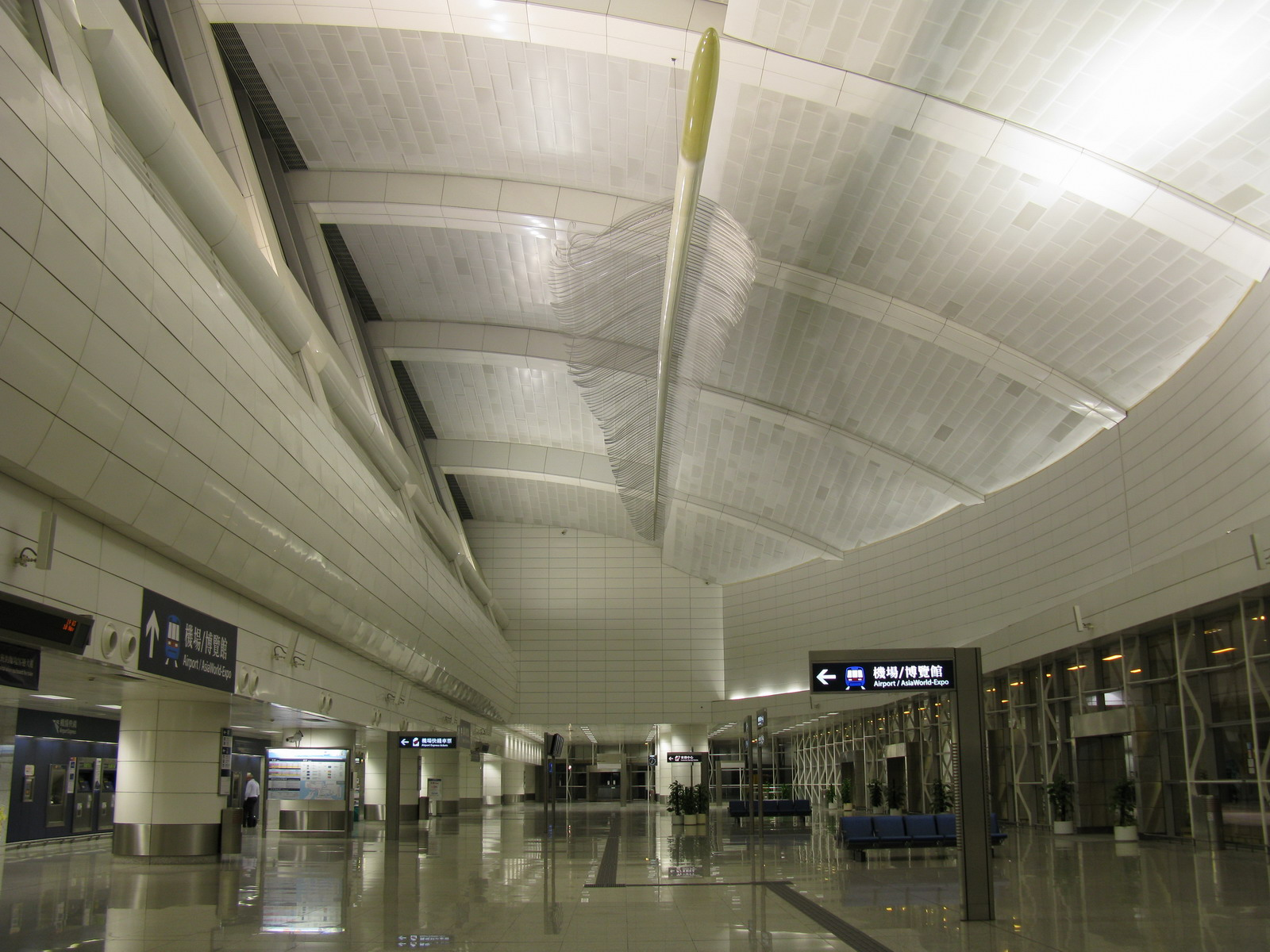
Tsing Yi station Airport Express concourse U4
