= Airport station (MTR) =

Rapid transit station in Hong Kong

Airport 機場
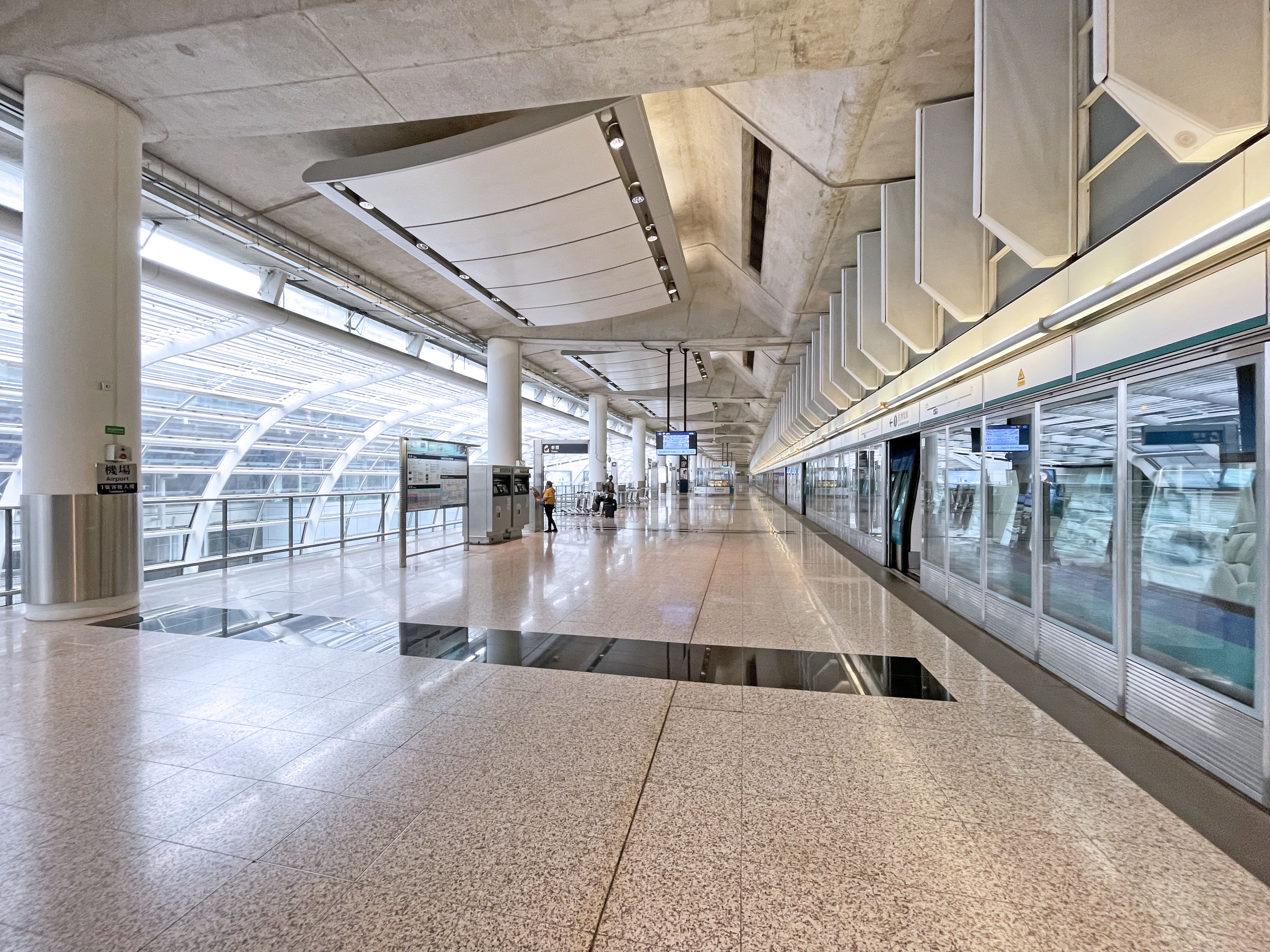
- Platform 1 of Airport station in May 2022

Chinese name
- Chinese: 機場
- Simplified Chinese: 机场
- Cantonese Yale: Gēichèung
- Literal meaning: Airport
Transcriptions
Standard Mandarin
- Hanyu Pinyin: jīcháng
Yue: Cantonese
- Yale Romanization: Gēichèung
- Jyutping: Gei1coeng4

General information
- Location: Cheong Tat Road, Chek Lap Kok; Lantau Island, Hong Kong
- Coordinates: 22°18′58″N 113°56′12″E
- System: MTR rapid transit station
- Owner: MTR Corporation
- Operator: MTR Corporation
- Line: Airport Express
- Platforms: 4 side platforms
- Tracks: 2
- Connections: Hong Kong International Airport; Bus; Taxi

Construction
- Structure type: Elevated
- Platform levels: 2
- Accessible: Yes
- Architect: Ronald Lu and Partners

Other information
- Station code: AIR
- IATA code: HKG

History
- Opened: 6 July 1998; 28 years ago

Key dates
- 1998: Station opened
- 2007: Terminal 2 platform 3 opened
- 2019: Terminal 2 platform 3 closed
- 2026: Terminal 2 platforms reopened

Services
Preceding station	MTR	Following station
Tsing Yi towards Hong Kong	Airport Express	AsiaWorld–Expo Terminus
Track layout
Location
- Location within MTR

Airport is a rapid transit station on the Airport Express of Hong Kong's MTR system. It serves the Hong Kong International Airport, and is integrated with the passenger terminal. It is also the westernmost railway station in Hong Kong.

== History ==
The station was built at the same time as the new Hong Kong International Airport, constructed on a platform of reclaimed land in order to replace Kai Tak Airport in the urban core.

In October 1993, the Airport Authority Hong Kong appointed Ove Arup and Partners to develop the concept design for the new airport's Ground Transportation Centre (GTC), which includes Airport station. Arup, Foster and Partners, and Anthony Ng Architects completed the detailed design of the GTC. Construction began in 1995. The main contractor was Nishimatsu Construction.

The station was opened on 6 July 1998 at the same time as the airport, and served as the western terminus station of the line until the opening of the AsiaWorld–Expo station on 20 December 2005.

Platform 3 was constructed opposite to platform 1 to enable access to SkyPlaza and Terminal 2. The new platform began operations on 28 February 2007, when the additional check-in facilities opened at Terminal 2. Until Terminal 2 was closed for expansion on 28 November 2019, Airport Express trains stopping at the station opened its two doors simultaneously for both platforms: doors on the left opened for Terminal 1, and doors on the right opened for Terminal 2 and SkyPlaza. This procedure resumed on 20 May 2026 with the reopening of Terminal 2, as well as the opening of a newly constructed platform 4 opposite platform 2.

== Station layout ==
L6 Upper Platforms (Departure Level)	Departure Hall	HKIA Terminal 2, Skyplaza
L6 Upper Platforms (Departure Level)	Departure Hall	Customer Service, ticket machines
L6 Upper Platforms (Departure Level)	Side platform, doors will open on the right
L6 Upper Platforms (Departure Level)	Platform; 3 ↑1 ↓	← Airport Express towards AsiaWorld–Expo (Terminus)
L6 Upper Platforms (Departure Level)	Side platform, doors will open on the left
L6 Upper Platforms (Departure Level)	Departure Hall	HKIA Terminal 1
L6 Upper Platforms (Departure Level)	Departure Hall	Customer Service, ticket machines
L5 Lower Platforms (Arrival Level)	Arrival Hall	HKIA Terminal 2
L5 Lower Platforms (Arrival Level)	Arrival Hall	Customer Service, ticket machines
L5 Lower Platforms (Arrival Level)	Side platform, doors will open on the left
L5 Lower Platforms (Arrival Level)	Platform; 4 ↑2 ↓	Airport Express towards Hong Kong (Tsing Yi) →
L5 Lower Platforms (Arrival Level)	Side platform, doors will open on the right
L5 Lower Platforms (Arrival Level)	Arrival Hall	HKIA Terminal 1
L5 Lower Platforms (Arrival Level)	Arrival Hall	Customer Service, ticket machines
L3 Ground Level	Ground	Ground Transportation Centre, Bus Terminus

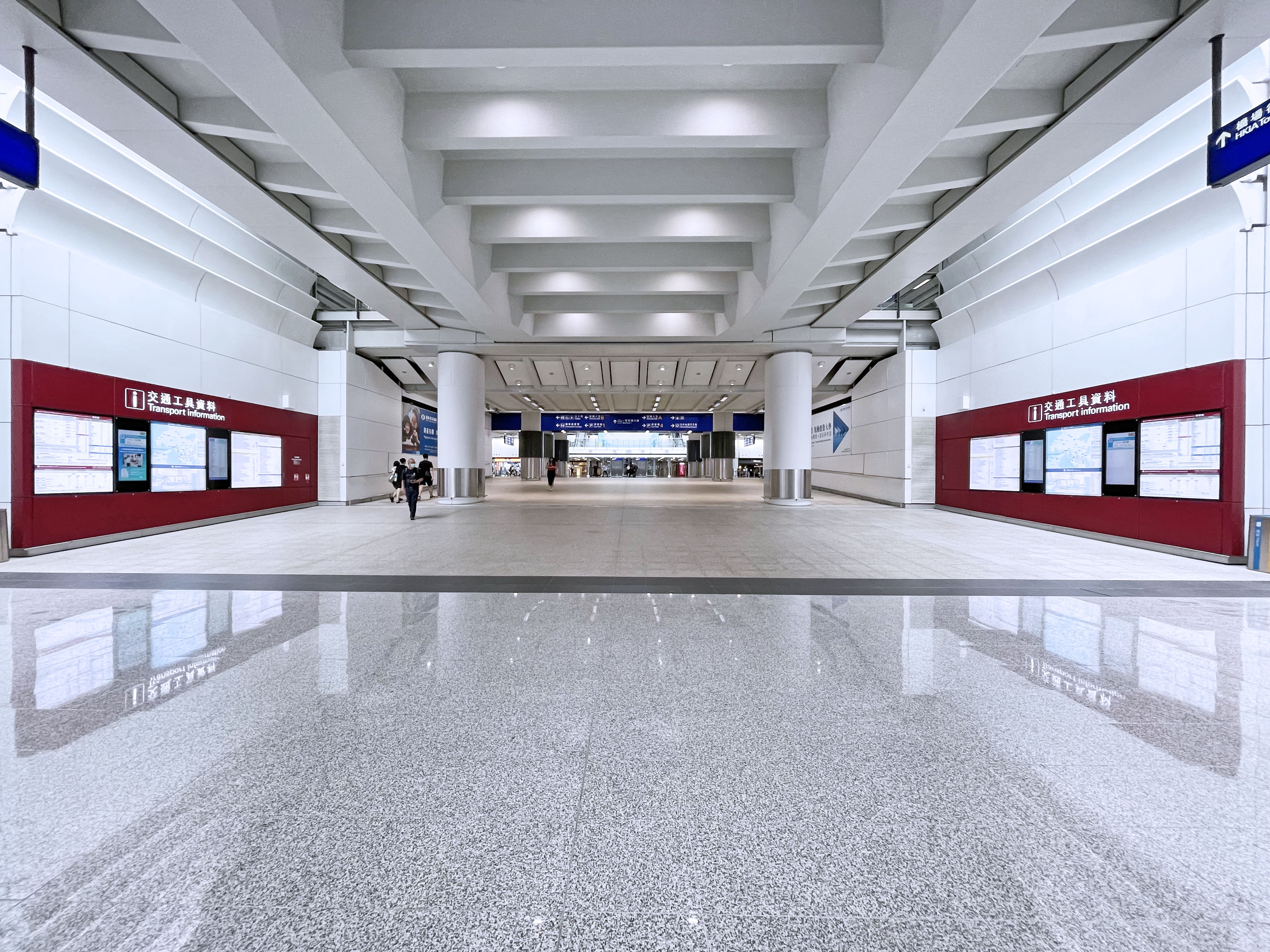
Walkway to station

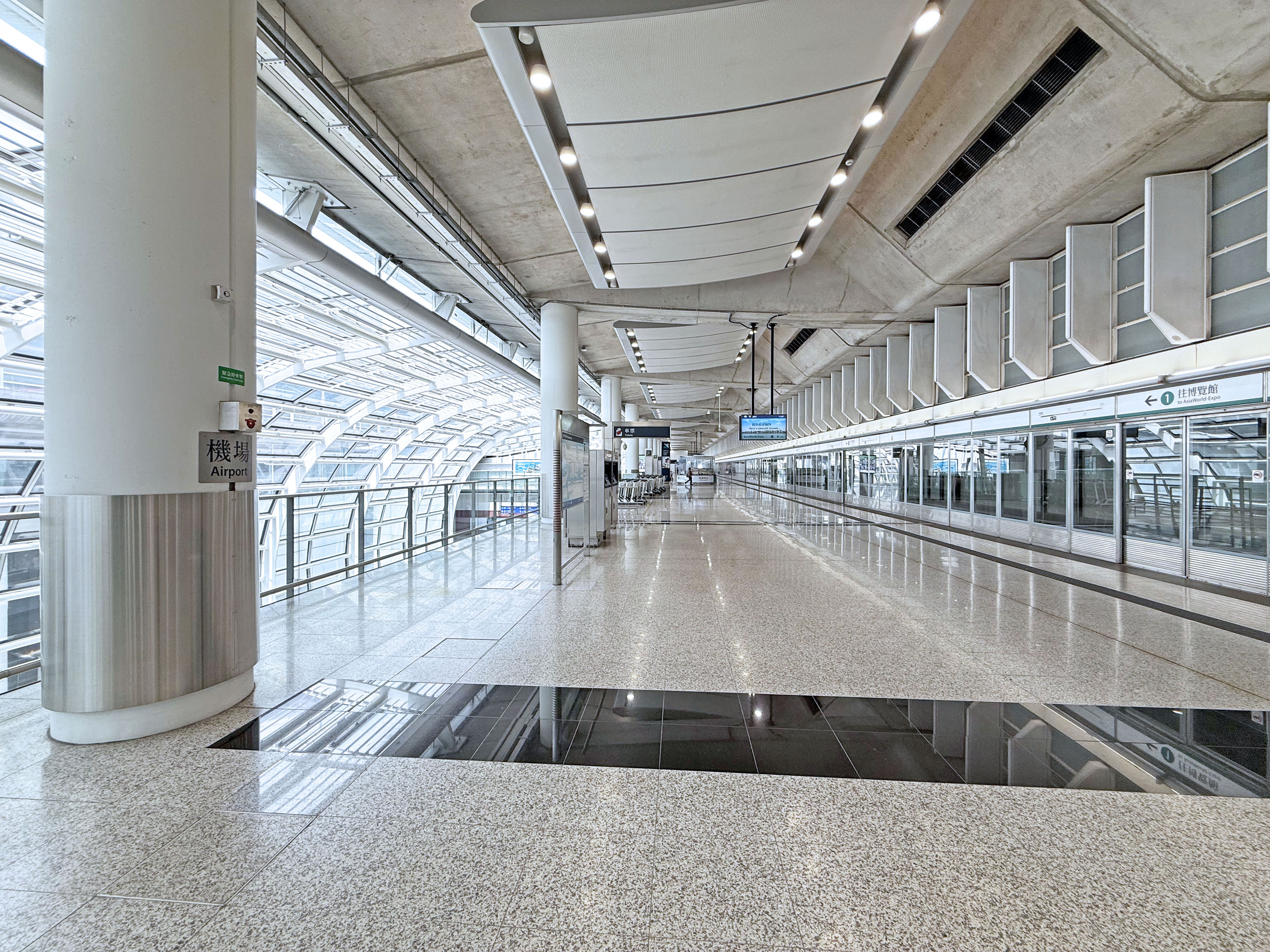
Platform 1

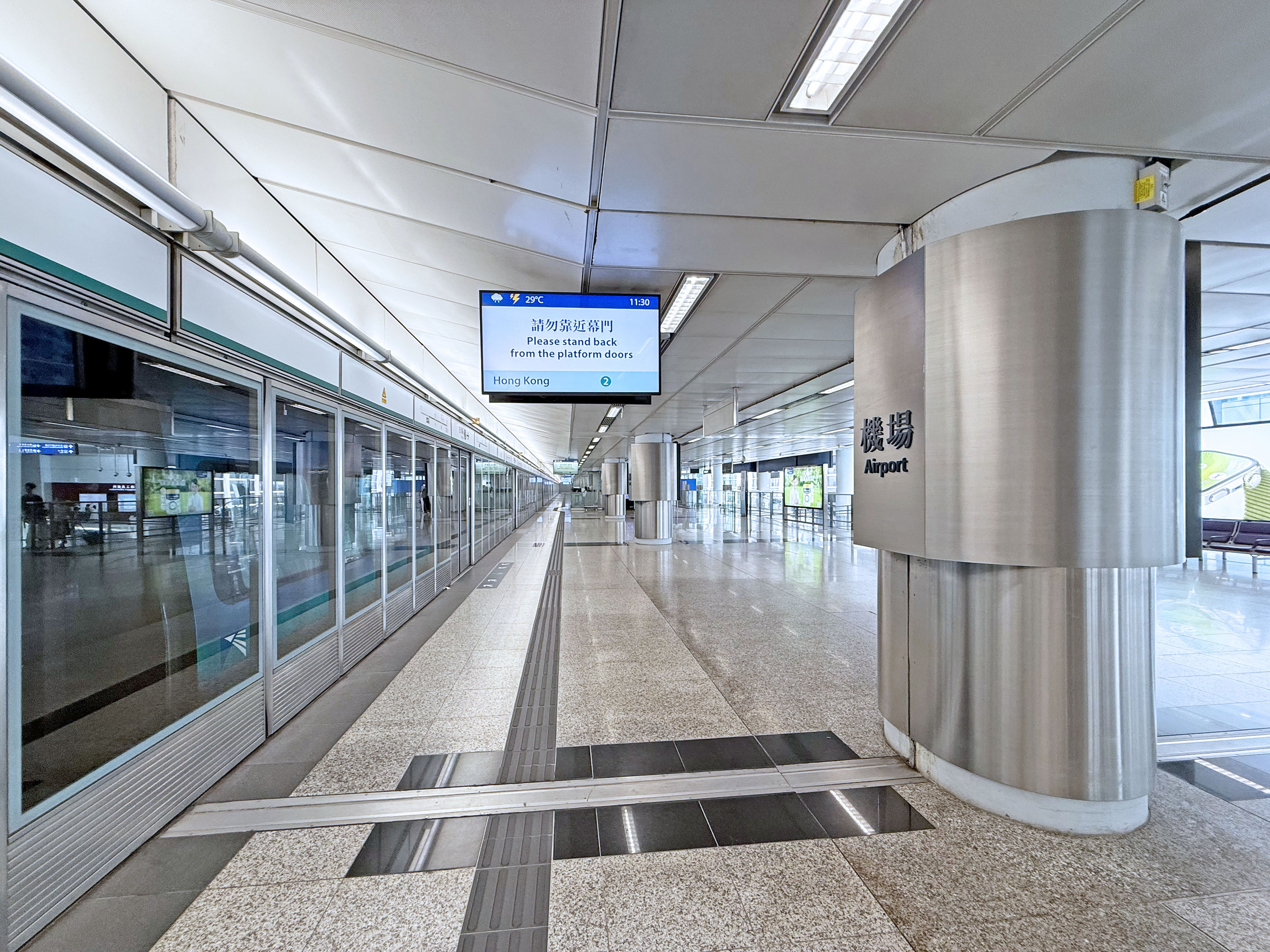
Platform 2

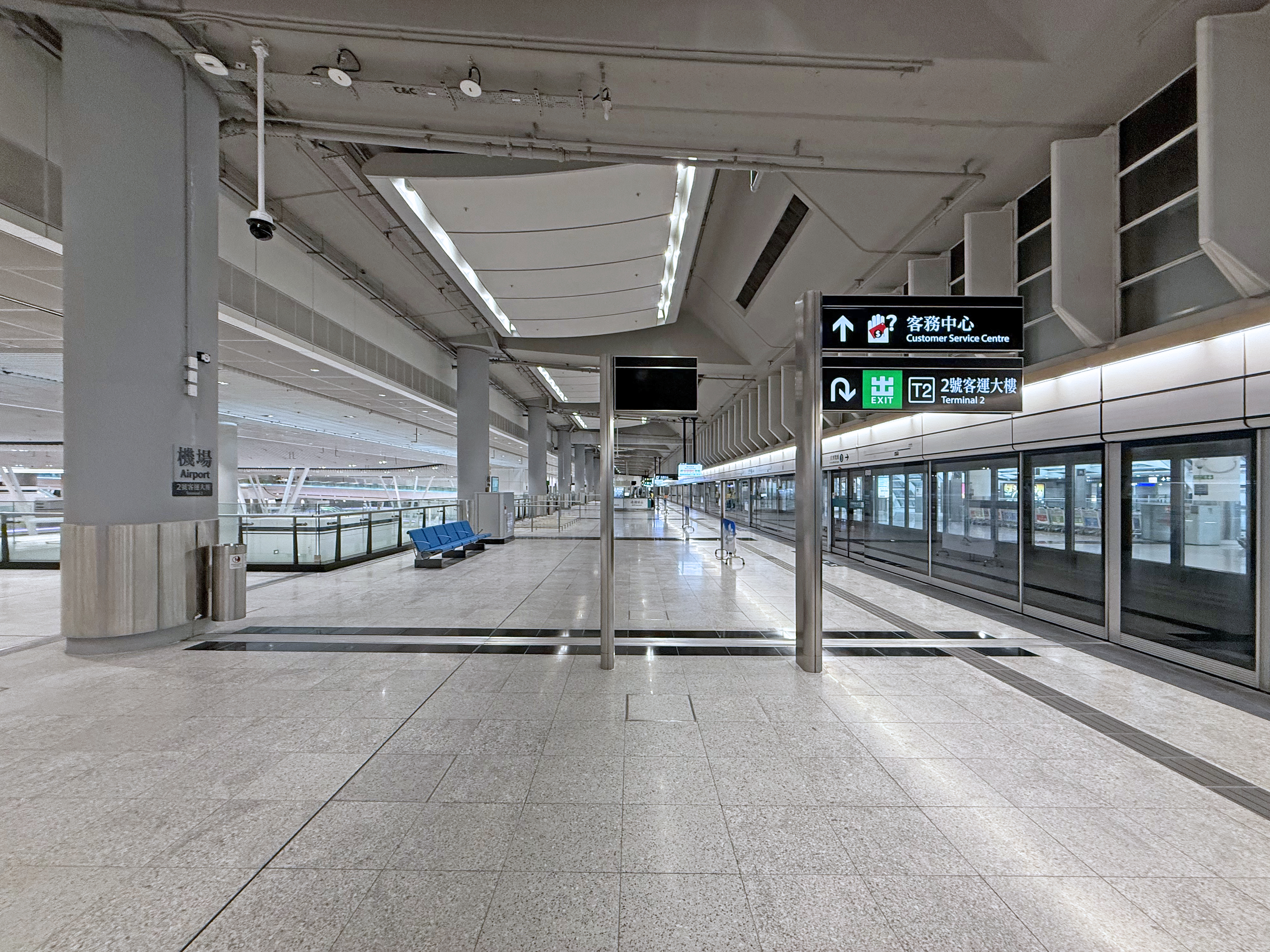
Platform 3

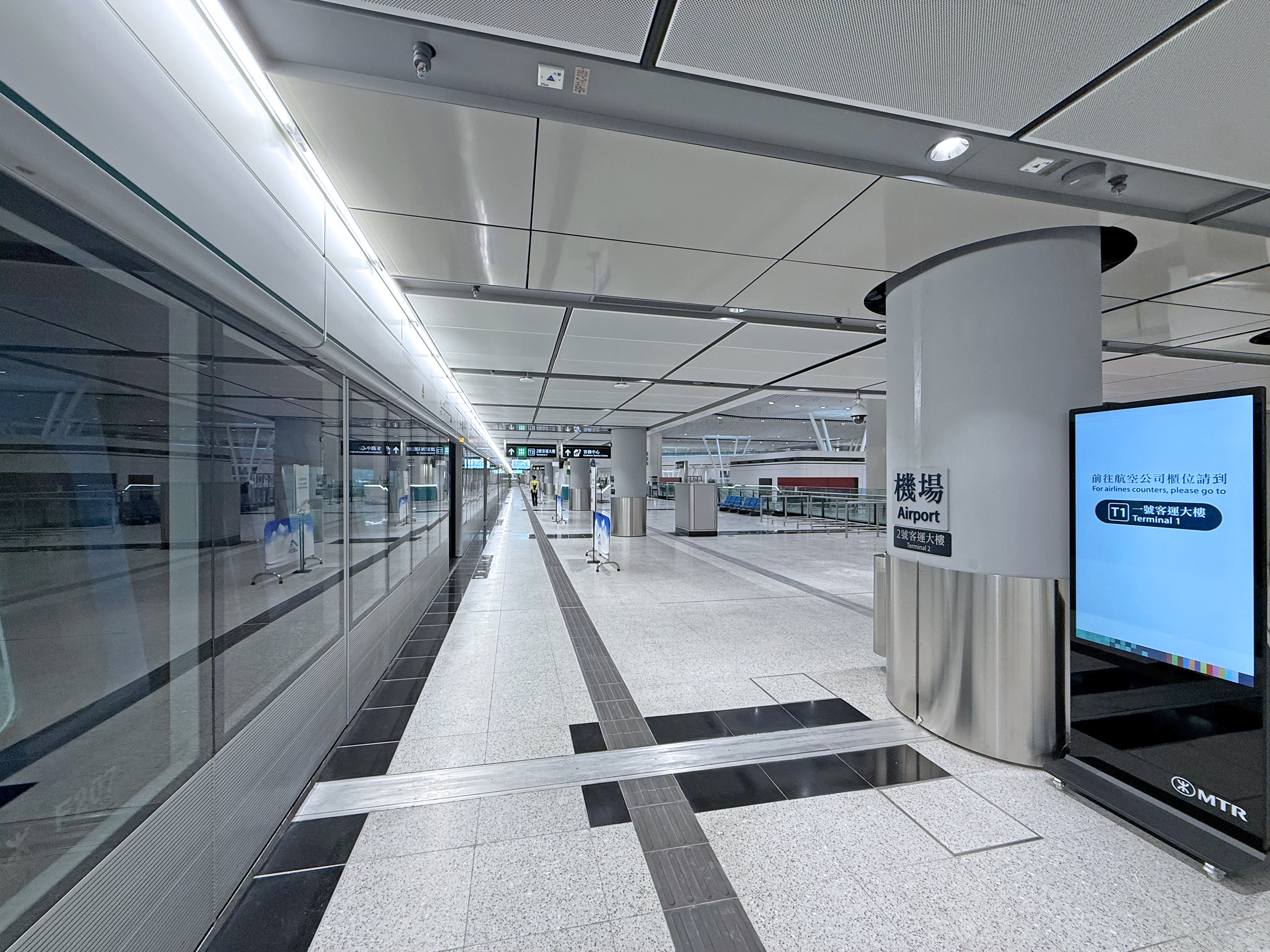
Platform 4

== Facilities ==
Due to the integration with the airport, no exit or entry gates are installed for the convenience of the travellers. Therefore, travellers can walk straight into the terminal building through the exit for their check-in procedures (if they have not completed In-Town Check-in). Ticket baskets are provided on the departure level for the travellers to dispose of their used tickets in. A souvenir shop is also found there.

While there are no entry gates provided at Airport station, passengers must still purchase valid train tickets or Octopus Cards with sufficient value from the ticket machines located in the arrivals and meeting hall or on the platforms of Airport station before boarding the train in order to exit through the ticketing gates at AsiaWorld–Expo, Tsing Yi, Kowloon or Hong Kong stations.

== Entrances/exits ==
- Trains to AsiaWorld–Expo: Departure level of Terminal 1 (7/F), Departure level of Terminal 2 (6/F)
- Trains to city: Arrival level of airport (5/F)

Travellers who arrive at the Airport can immediately enter the terminal with any baggage they have and walk into the passenger terminal. No exit gates are provided.
