= Central station (MTR) =

MTR interchange station on Hong Kong Island

Central 中環
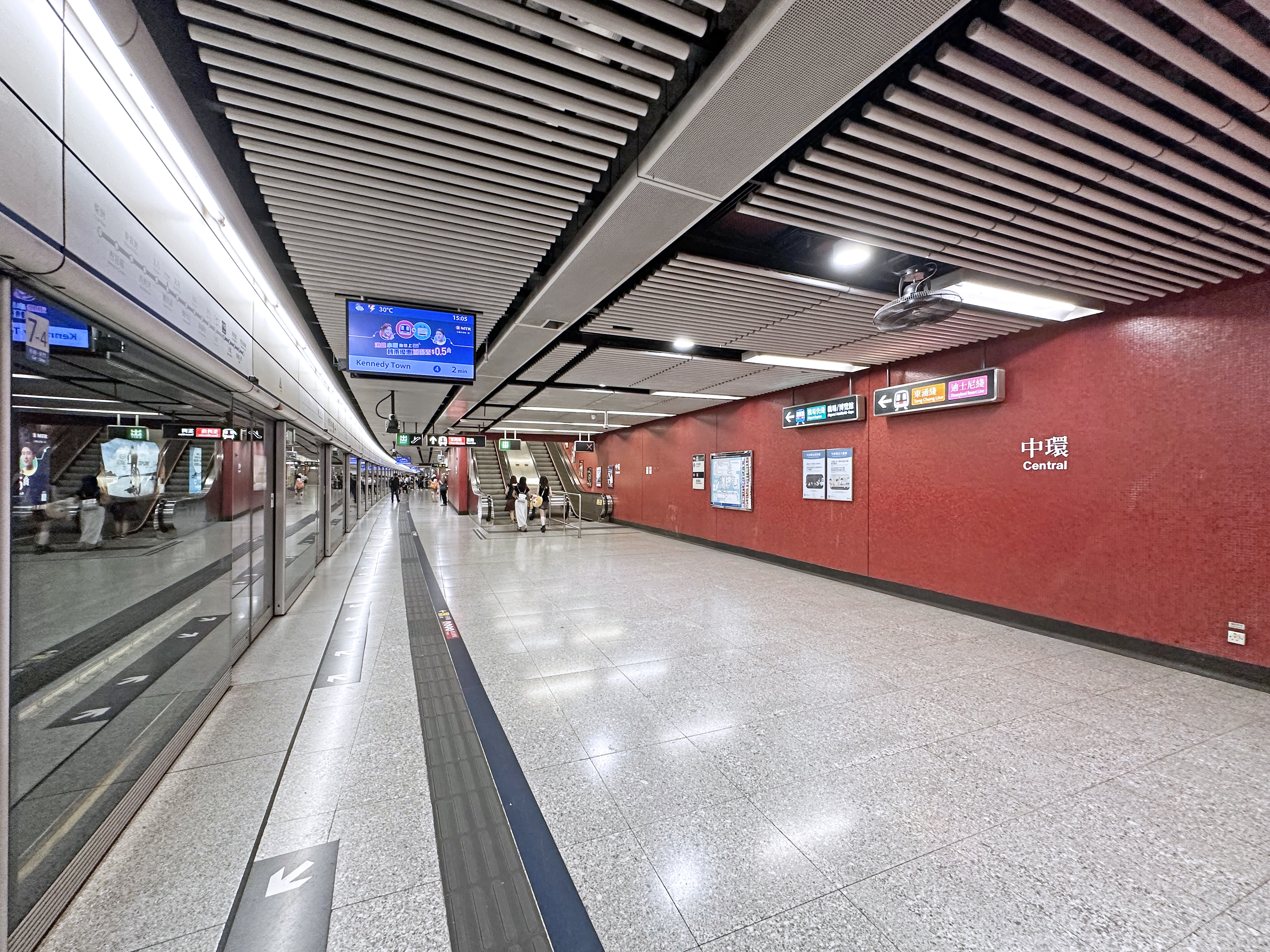
- Platform 4 on the Island line in June 2024

Chinese name
- Traditional Chinese: 中環
- Simplified Chinese: 中环
- Cantonese Yale: Jūngwàan
- Literal meaning: Central ring
Transcriptions
Standard Mandarin
- Hanyu Pinyin: Zhōnghuán
Yue: Cantonese
- Yale Romanization: Jūngwàan
- Jyutping: Zung1waan4

General information
- Location: Des Voeux Road Central/Chater Road, Central; Central and Western District, Hong Kong
- Coordinates: 22°16′55″N 114°09′27″E
- System: MTR rapid transit station
- Owner: MTR Corporation
- Operator: MTR Corporation
- Lines: Tsuen Wan line; Island line
- Platforms: 4; Tsuen Wan line : 1 island platform; Island line : 2 split-level side platforms
- Tracks: 4
- Connections: Hong Kong: Tung Chung line; Airport Express; Peak Tram; Tram; Bus, minibus; Ferries to Tsim Sha Tsui and Outlying Islands

Construction
- Structure type: Underground
- Platform levels: 3
- Accessible: Yes

Other information
- Station code: CEN

History
- Opened: Kwun Tong line : 12 February 1980; 46 years ago; Island line : 23 May 1986; 40 years ago
- Former names: Chater (Tsuen Wan line); Pedder (Island line)

Services
Preceding station	MTR	Following station
Terminus	Tsuen Wan line	Admiralty towards Tsuen Wan
Sheung Wan towards Kennedy Town	Island line	Admiralty towards Chai Wan
Transfer at Hong Kong
Terminus	Airport Express transfer at Hong Kong	Kowloon towards AsiaWorld–Expo
Terminus	Tung Chung line transfer at Hong Kong	Kowloon towards Tung Chung
Track layout
Location
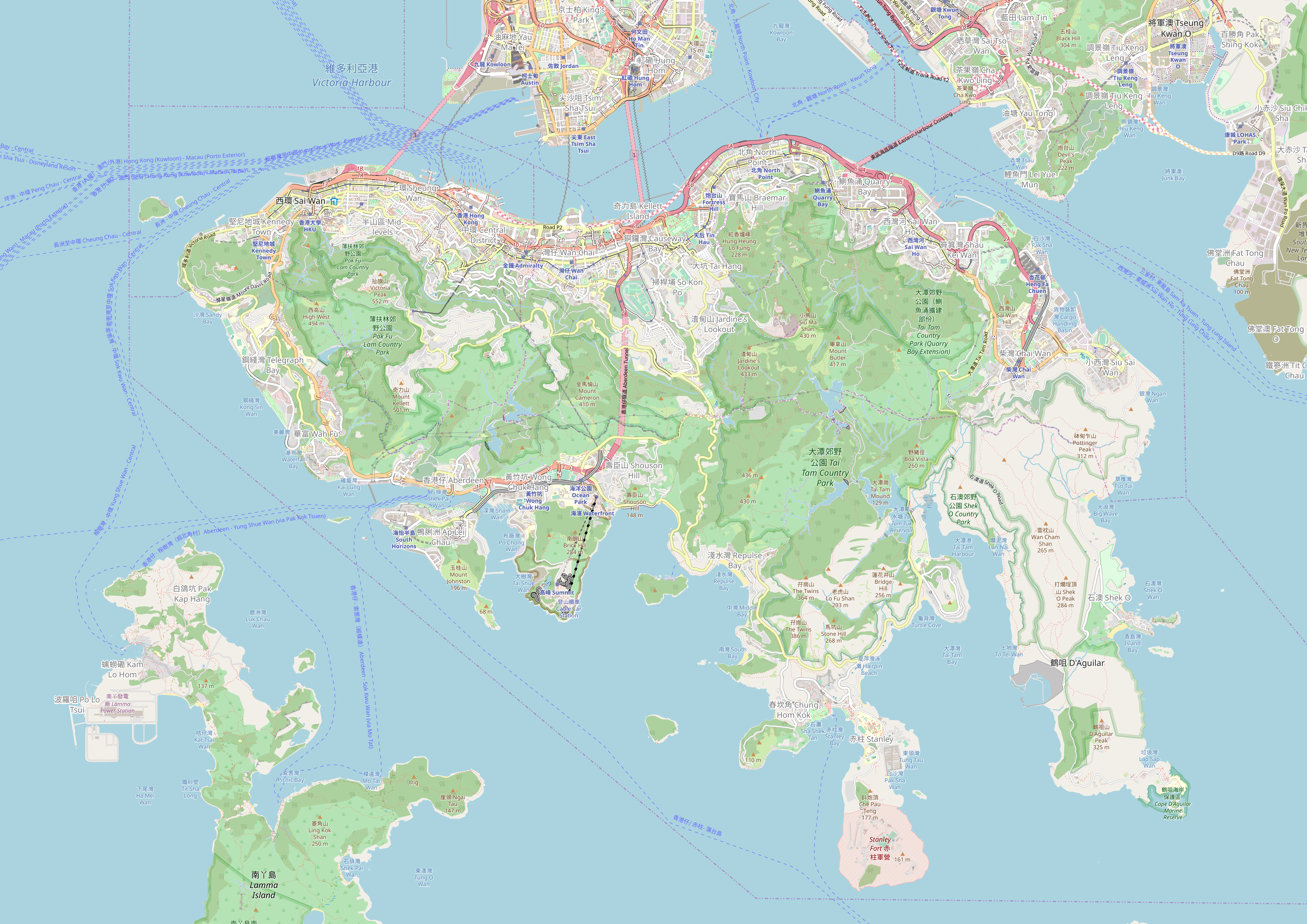
- Location within MTR Location within Hong Kong urban core Location within Hong Kong Island

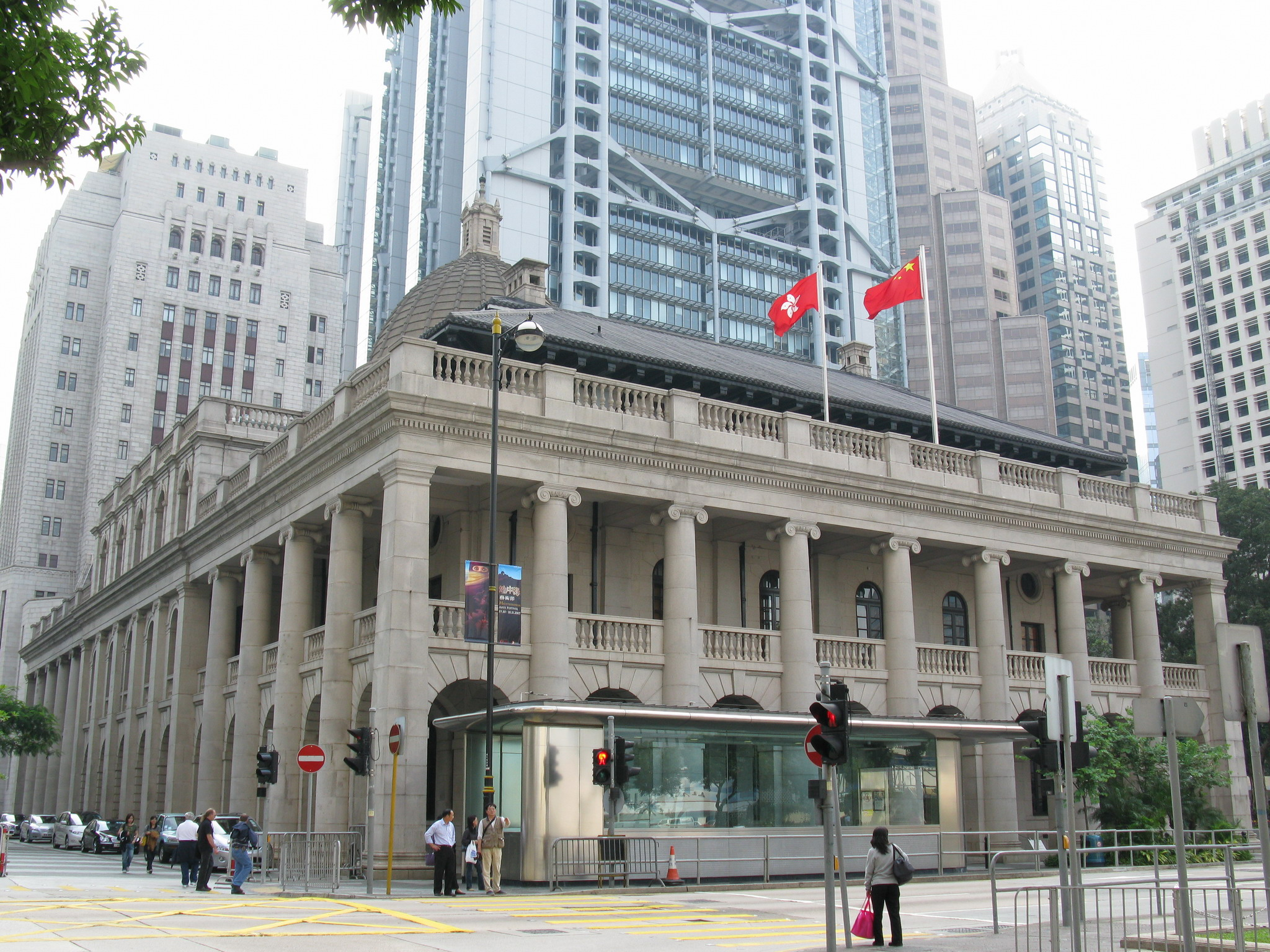
The platforms of the Tsuen Wan line are located under Chater Road, next to the Court of Final Appeal Building. Taken in November 2007.

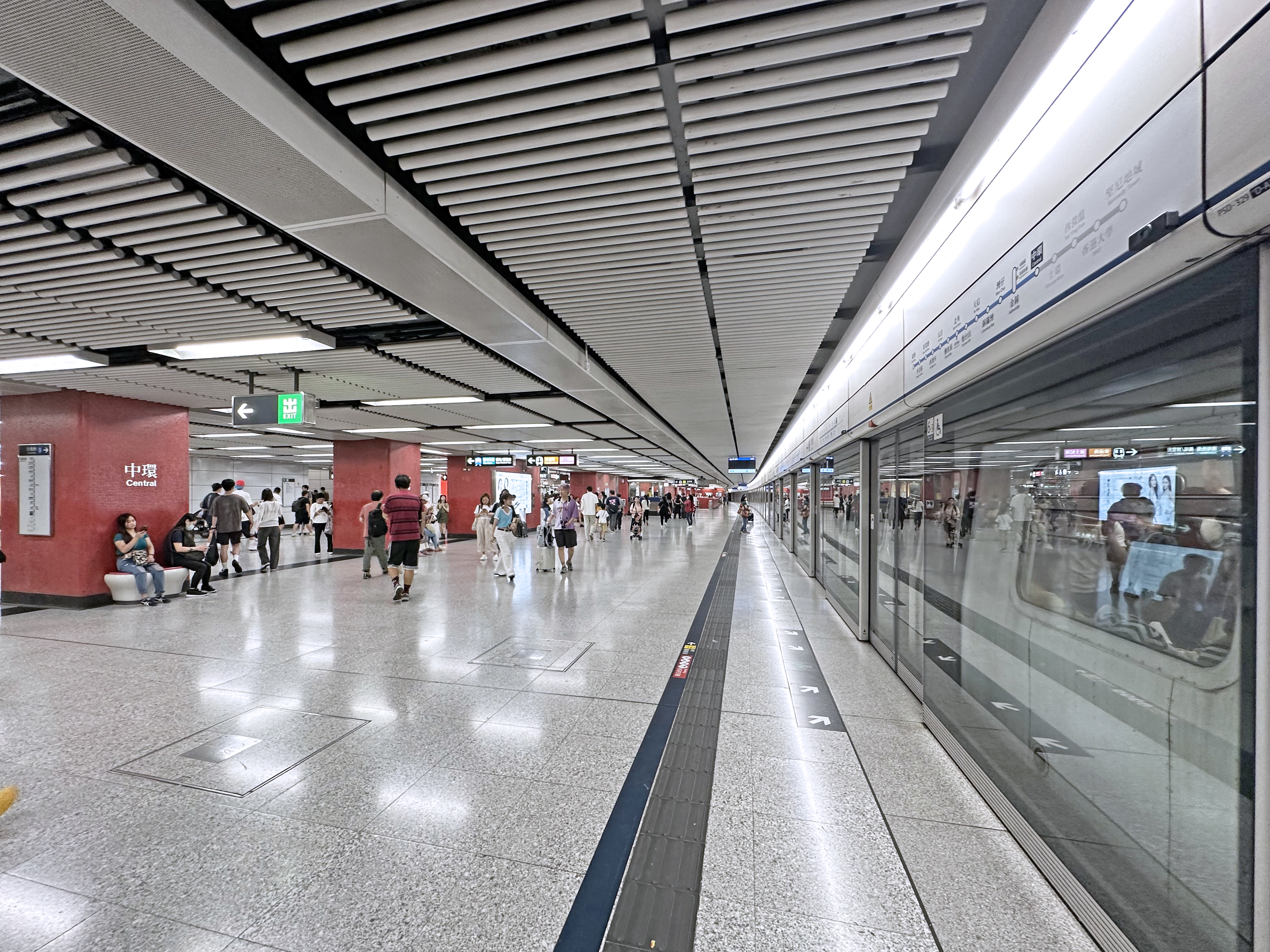
Platform 3 on the Island line in June 2024

Central (Chinese: 中環; Cantonese Yale: Jūngwàan) (formerly named Chater until 31 May 1985) is an MTR station located in the Central area of Hong Kong Island. The station's livery is firebrick red but dark brown on the Tsuen Wan line platforms. The station is the southern terminus of the Tsuen Wan line, a stop on the Island line, and connects to Hong Kong station (via an underground passageway), which serves the Tung Chung line and the Airport Express.

The station was originally named Chater Station (due to its location near Chater Road). It was initially conceived to cater to 330,000 passengers daily and was planned to be 380 m (1,250 ft) long – one of the longest stations in the world. More than 200,000 passengers use this station daily. The longest distance between two exits is approximately 700m.

== History ==
=== Early plans ===
Central station was included in the Hong Kong Mass Transport Study, a system proposed in September 1967. Together with Western Market station, it was intended to serve as an interchange station for the Kwun Tong line and Island line. In the recommended system, the Tsuen Wan line would terminate at Admiralty (in the report also known as Naval Dockyard). The station was originally planned to be located under Des Voeux Road Central between Jubilee Street and Pedder Street.

In 1970, in the Hong Kong Mass Transit Further Studies, the station was proposed as two separate but connected stations: Chater station (遮打站) under Chater Road and Pedder station (必打站) under Pedder Street), which would serve the Kong Kow line (now Tsuen Wan line) and Island line respectively.

=== Modified Initial System and opening ===
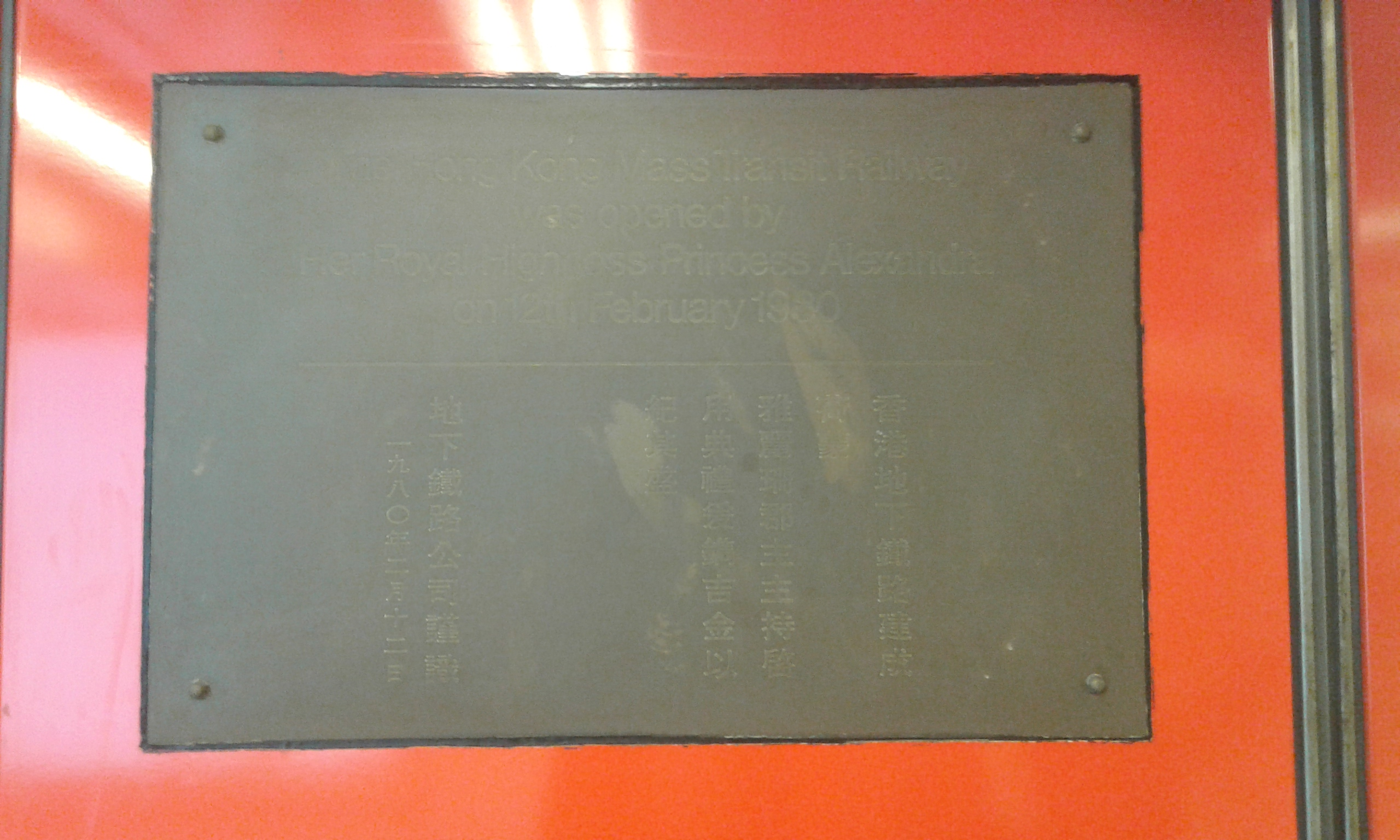
A plaque was erected on 12 February 1980 to mark the opening of the Modified Initial System by Princess Alexandra.

Contracts 106 and 809, which consist of the construction of the two stations and tunnels, were awarded to Metro Joint Venture, comprising Hochtief AG, Dragages et Travaux Publics, Gammon (HK) Limited, and Sentab.

The station first opened as Chater station on 12 February 1980 as the terminus of the Kwun Tong line. Only a portion of the station came into operation as the Island line had not been opened yet.

The station was named Chater in English but 中環 (Central) in Chinese. This would be misleading for people who knew both English and Cantonese, as many thought that the Chinese name would be 遮打, a transliteration and the Chinese name of the namesake road.

When the Island line between Admiralty and Chai Wan opened on 31 May 1985, MTR renamed Chater to Central together with the renaming of some other stations on the Kwun Tong and Tsuen Wan lines.

The English name of the station was changed to "Central" in 1982.

The construction contract for the station on the Island line was awarded to the Aoki/Tobishima joint venture. Construction for the Island line was carried out in early 1983 and connected the new platforms with the original structure. The Island line began servicing Central on 23 May 1986 when it was extended beyond Admiralty to Sheung Wan and the Island line platforms came into service.

=== Island line ===
The construction contract for the station on the Island line was awarded to the Aoki/Tobishima joint venture. Construction for the Island line was carried out in early 1983 and connected the new platforms with the original structure. The Island line began servicing Central on 23 May 1986 when it was extended beyond Admiralty to Sheung Wan and the Island line platforms came into service.

=== Passageway to Hong Kong station ===
One component of the Airport Core Programme between 1991 and 1998 was a railway connecting the new Hong Kong International Airport to the city centre. To link Central with the nearby Hong Kong station, the southern terminus of the Tung Chung line and the Airport Express, a passageway was built under Connaught Road Central to connect the two stations. The passageway starts at the Pedder Street concourse and was built with a design similar to that of Hong Kong station. The passage connects the paid areas of both stations (particularly from Central to the Tung Chung line of Hong Kong station). There is no unpaid link (though access to the Airport Express line at Hong Kong station from other lines at Central or vice versa requires an out-of-system transfer as the Airport Express line follows a separate fare scheme from the rest of the MTR system).

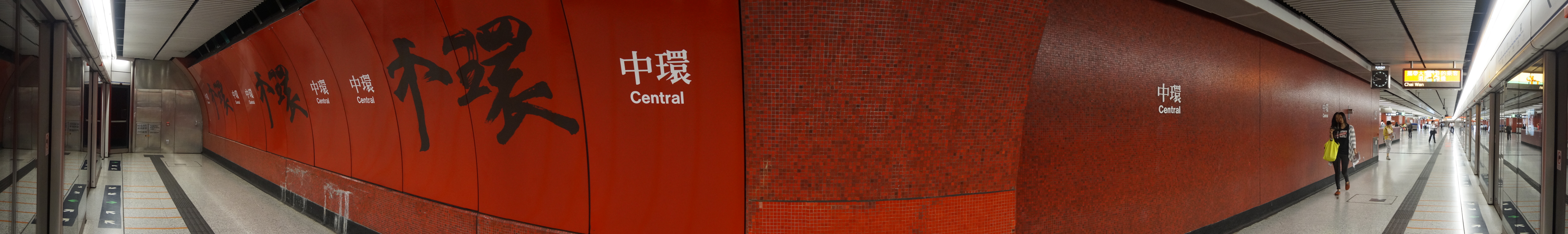
Panorama of Platform 3 on the Island line towards Chai Wan in September 2013

== Station layout ==
Central station has four platforms on three levels.

The top level includes platform 3 and is built beneath Des Voeux Road Central at the intersection of Pedder Street, stretching from World-Wide House to Alexandra House, on the northern side of the road. The platform serves Chai Wan-bound trains on the Island line and this level includes the connecting walkway to Hong Kong station.

The middle level includes platforms 1 and 2 using a shared island. They serve the Tsuen Wan line and were built directly under Chater Road, extending from Des Voeux Road Central to Club Street.

The bottom level, two levels from the top level, is platform 4, for Island line trains in the direction of Kennedy Town.

Passengers from platform 3 transferring to Tsuen Wan line platforms use the regular escalators on the Chater Road concourse. There are designated escalators from Tsuen Wan line platforms to platform 4 for the sole purpose of transfer.

The Tsuen Wan line platforms are straight and were built by cut-and-cover. Most of the length of the Island line platforms is the same, although the eastern part (towards Admiralty) is curved and the gap is large, as they are located in sections of bored tunnels and have the curved walls typical of most other stations on the Island line.

The end of the Admiralty stabling siding shared by Tsuen Wan and Island lines is located below the Tsuen Wan line platforms.

G	Street level	Exits
P	Chater Road concourse	–
L1	Pedder Street concourse	Customer Service, MTRShops; Hang Seng Bank, vending machines Octopus promotion machine
L1	Chater Road concourse	Customer Service, MTRShops; ATM
L2Upper Platform	Chater Road concourse	Customer Service, MTRShops; Hang Seng Bank, vending machines
L2Upper Platform	Pedder Street concourse	Customer Service, MTRShops; Subway to Hong Kong station for Tung Chung line & Airport Express; Octopus promotion machine, i-centre internet service
L2Upper Platform	Side platform, doors will open on the left
L2Upper Platform	Platform 3	Island line towards Chai Wan (Admiralty)
L3Middle Platforms	Platform 1	Tsuen Wan line towards Tsuen Wan (Admiralty) →
L3Middle Platforms	Island platform, doors will open on the left or right
L3Middle Platforms	Platform 2	Tsuen Wan line towards Tsuen Wan (Admiralty) →
L4Lower Platform	Side platform, doors will open on the right
L4Lower Platform	Platform 4	← Island line towards Kennedy Town (Sheung Wan)

== Entrances and exits ==
Central station stretches underneath Chater Road from Statue Square in the east and underneath Des Voeux Road to Li Yuen Street East in the west. The distance between the easternmost and westernmost exits is approximately 700m. There are 13 entrances, connecting buildings, shopping malls, main roads and ground transport facilities nearby.

Pedder Street Concourse

- A: Connaught Road Central, Central Pier, Internation Finance Centre(IFC)
- B: World-wide House, Hang Seng Bank Headquarters
- C: Li Yuen Street (East & West)
- D1: Pedder Street
- D2: Queens Road Central, Lan Kwai Fong

Chater Road Concourse

- E: Chater House, Chater Road
- F: St George's Building, Mandarin Oriental Hotel
- G: The Landmark
- H: Alexandra House
- J1: Court of Final Appeal
- J2: Chater Garden, Bank of China Tower, Peak Tram station, Cheung Kong Center
- J3: AIA Central, Bank of America Tower
- K: Statue Square, HSBC Main Building, Standard Chartered Bank Building
- L: CCB Tower

== Transport connections ==
Central station is one of the major transport hubs of Hong Kong. It is commonly used as a connecting hub for commuters travelling from the Tung Chung line to the Island line, and Tsuen Wan line. The area around Central station and Hong Kong station offers a wide range of transport options, including the tramway, buses, ferries, minibuses and more. (See also Transport in Hong Kong)

- Bus
  - Citybus
  - KMB, serving only cross-harbour routes on Hong Kong Island
  - Nearby bus termini:
    - Central Piers Bus Terminus (exit A or E then via footbridge, of within paid area via Hong Kong station)
    - City Hall Bus Terminus (exit K then via tunnel)
    - Exchange Square Bus Terminus (exit A then via footbridge, or within paid area via Hong Kong station)
- Minibus
- Trams
  - Hong Kong Tramways (exits B, C, G and K)
  - Peak Tram (exit J2)
- Ferries (exit A to Central Ferry Piers)
  - Pier 2: Park Island Ferry, to Park Island
  - Pier 3: Discovery Bay Ferry, to Discovery Bay
  - Pier 4: Hong Kong & Kowloon Ferry, to Sok Kwu Wan and Yung Shue Wan on Lamma Island
  - Piers 5 and 6: Sun Ferry, to Silvermine Bay (Mui Wo), Peng Chau and Cheung Chau
  - Pier 7: Star Ferry, to Tsim Sha Tsui
