= AsiaWorld–Expo station =

MTR station in the New Territories, Hong Kong

AsiaWorld–Expo 博覽館
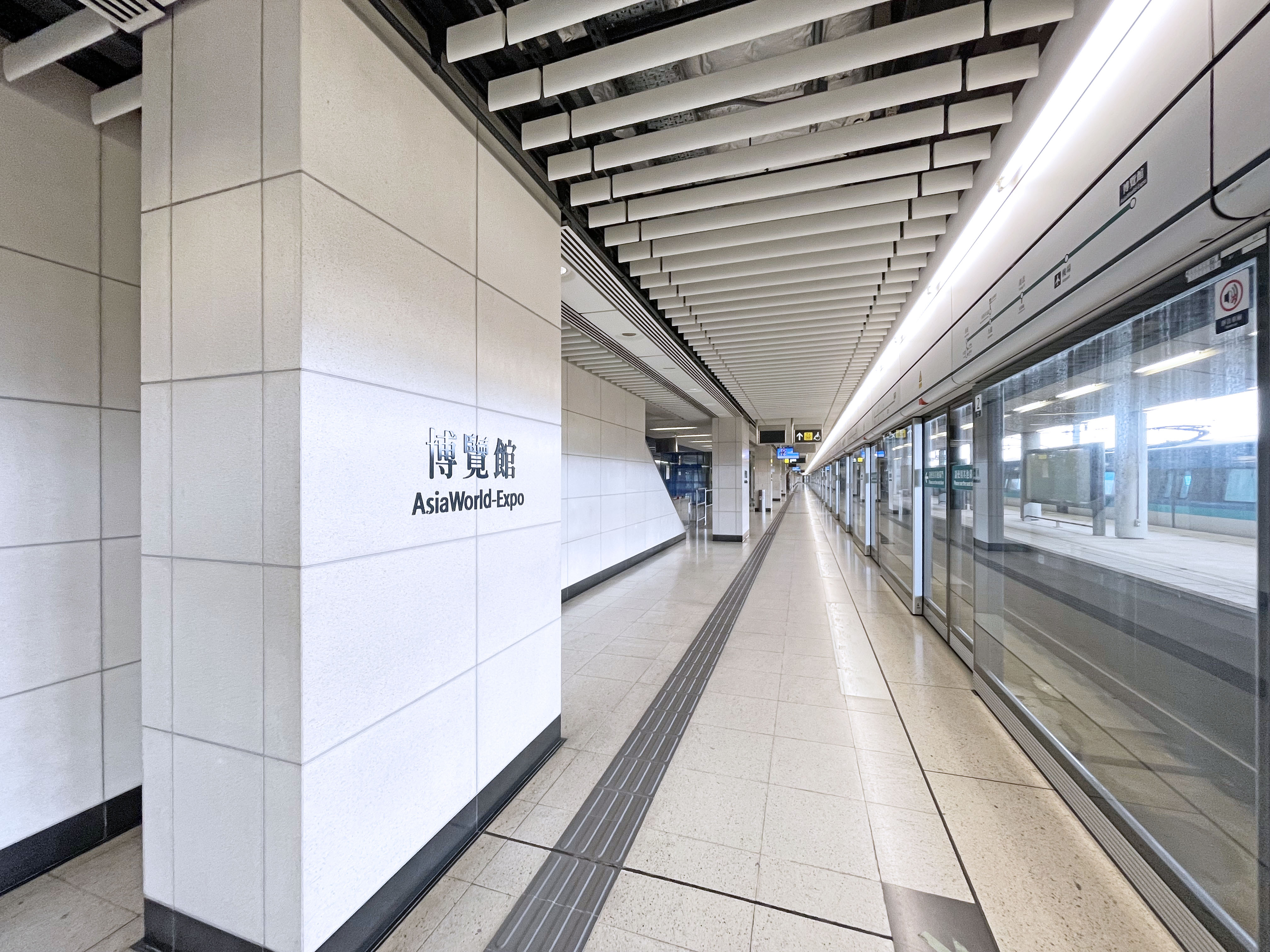
- Platform 1 of AsiaWorld–Expo station in 2022

Chinese name
- Traditional Chinese: 博覽館
- Cantonese Yale: bok láahm gún
- Literal meaning: Expo hall
Transcriptions
Standard Mandarin
- Hanyu Pinyin: Bólǎnguǎn
Yue: Cantonese
- Yale Romanization: bok láahm gún
- Jyutping: bok3 laam5 gun2

General information
- Location: AsiaWorld–Expo, Airport Expo Boulevard, Chek Lap Kok, Lantau Island; Islands District, Hong Kong
- Coordinates: 22°19′18″N 113°56′28″E
- System: MTR rapid transit station
- Owner: MTR Corporation
- Operator: MTR Corporation
- Line: Airport Express
- Platforms: 1 side platform
- Tracks: 2
- Connections: Bus

Construction
- Structure type: At-grade
- Platform levels: 1
- Accessible: Yes
- Architect: Ronald Lu and Partners

Other information
- Station code: AWE

History
- Opened: 20 December 2005; 20 years ago

Services
Preceding station	MTR	Following station
Airport towards Hong Kong	Airport Express	Terminus
Route map
Location
- Location within MTR

AsiaWorld–Expo is the western terminus of the Airport Express of the Hong Kong MTR. It serves the AsiaWorld–Expo in the northeast corner of Chek Lap Kok, the island on which the Hong Kong International Airport is located.

The AsiaWorld–Expo is an exhibition centre designed to host largescale events located adjacent to Hong Kong International Airport. The Airport Express was extended with a new station at AsiaWorld–Expo to accommodate visitors and organisers.

== History ==
Tracks were already laid to the site of the AsiaWorld–Expo station when the Airport Express was inaugurated on 6 July 1998. Trains terminated at Airport, but the tracks were originally used as a turn back siding before the station was built. The station opened on 20 December 2005 together with the exhibition centre, allowing it to be accessible by rail from the central business district and other MTR stations.

== Station layout ==
U1	Concourse	Exits (AsiaWorld–Expo), Customer Service, automatic teller machines
G	Side platform, doors will open on the right
G	Platform 1	Airport Express towards Hong Kong (Airport) →
G	Island platform, not in regular service
G		Not in regular service

Like the other stations on the Airport Express, AsiaWorld–Expo contains platform screen doors. However, the screen doors at this station are different from other stations of the Airport Express, as they are designed for the trains of Tung Chung line as well, so those trains can also be used to run services from and to the station in order to increase passenger flow when large exhibitions or concerts are being held.

== Entrances/exits ==
- A: AsiaWorld–Expo East Entrance
- B: AsiaWorld–Expo West Entrance (opens only during large-scale events)
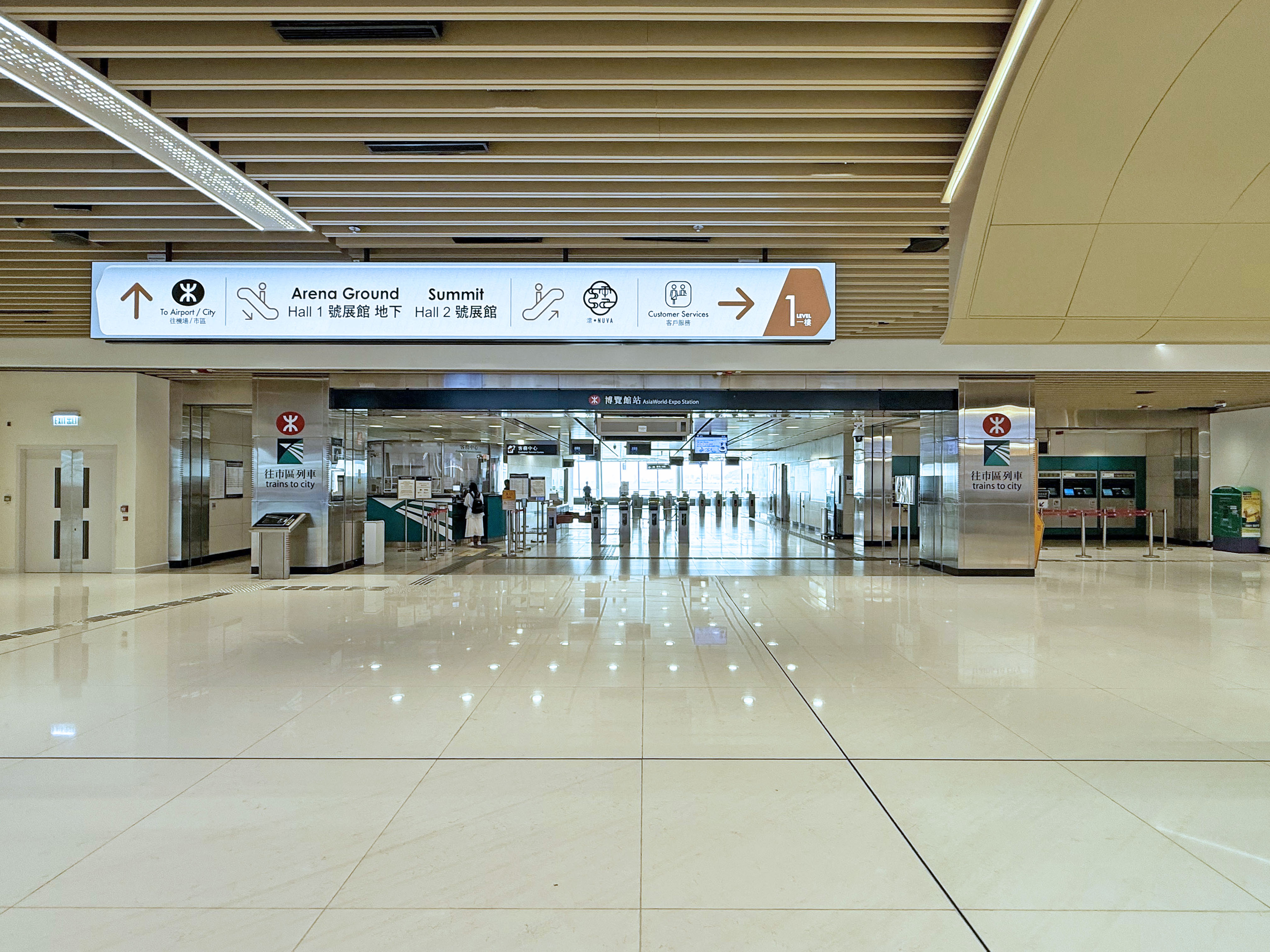
Exit A

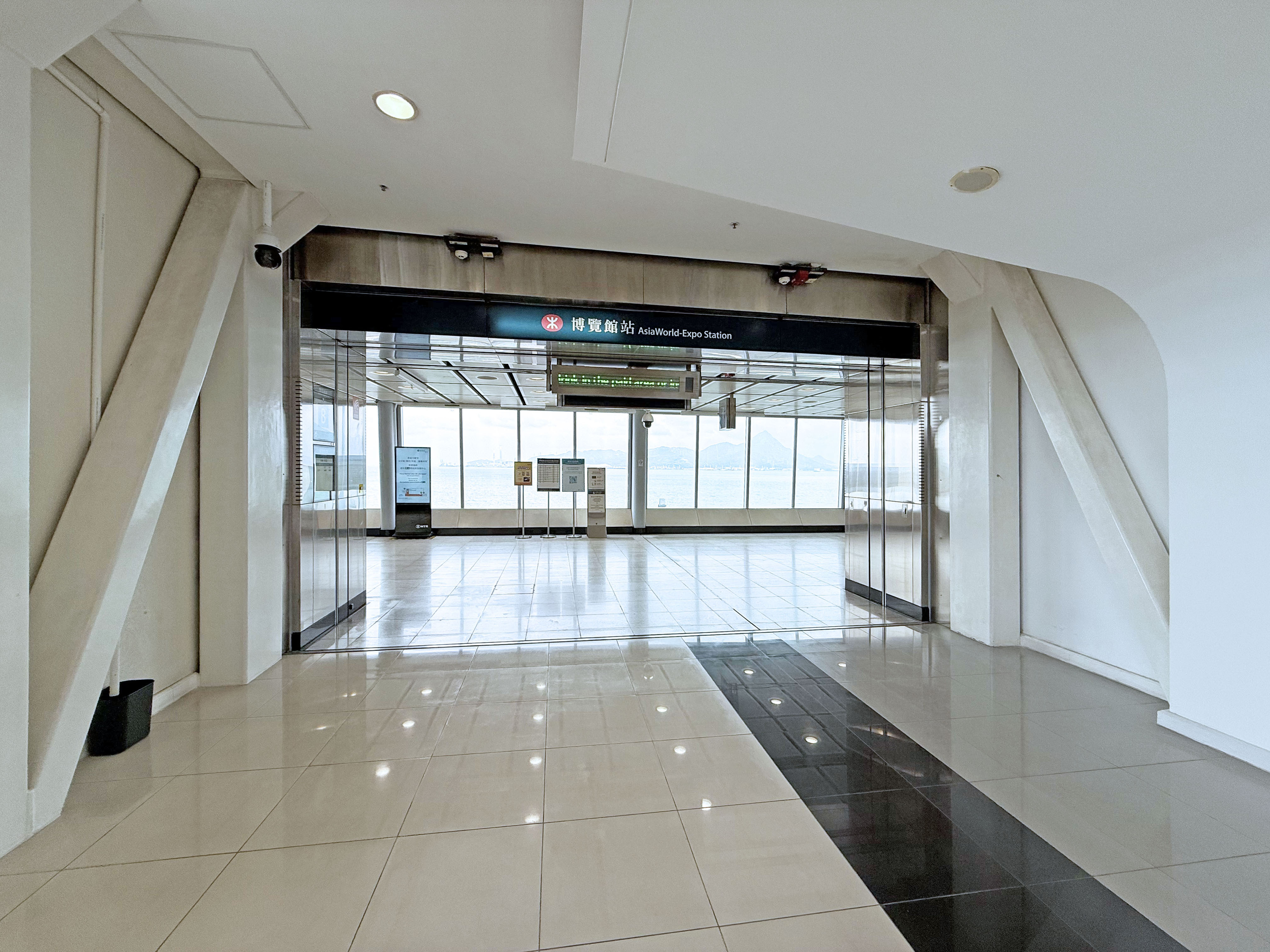
Exit B
