= Hong Kong station =

MTR interchange station on Hong Kong Island

Hong Kong 香港
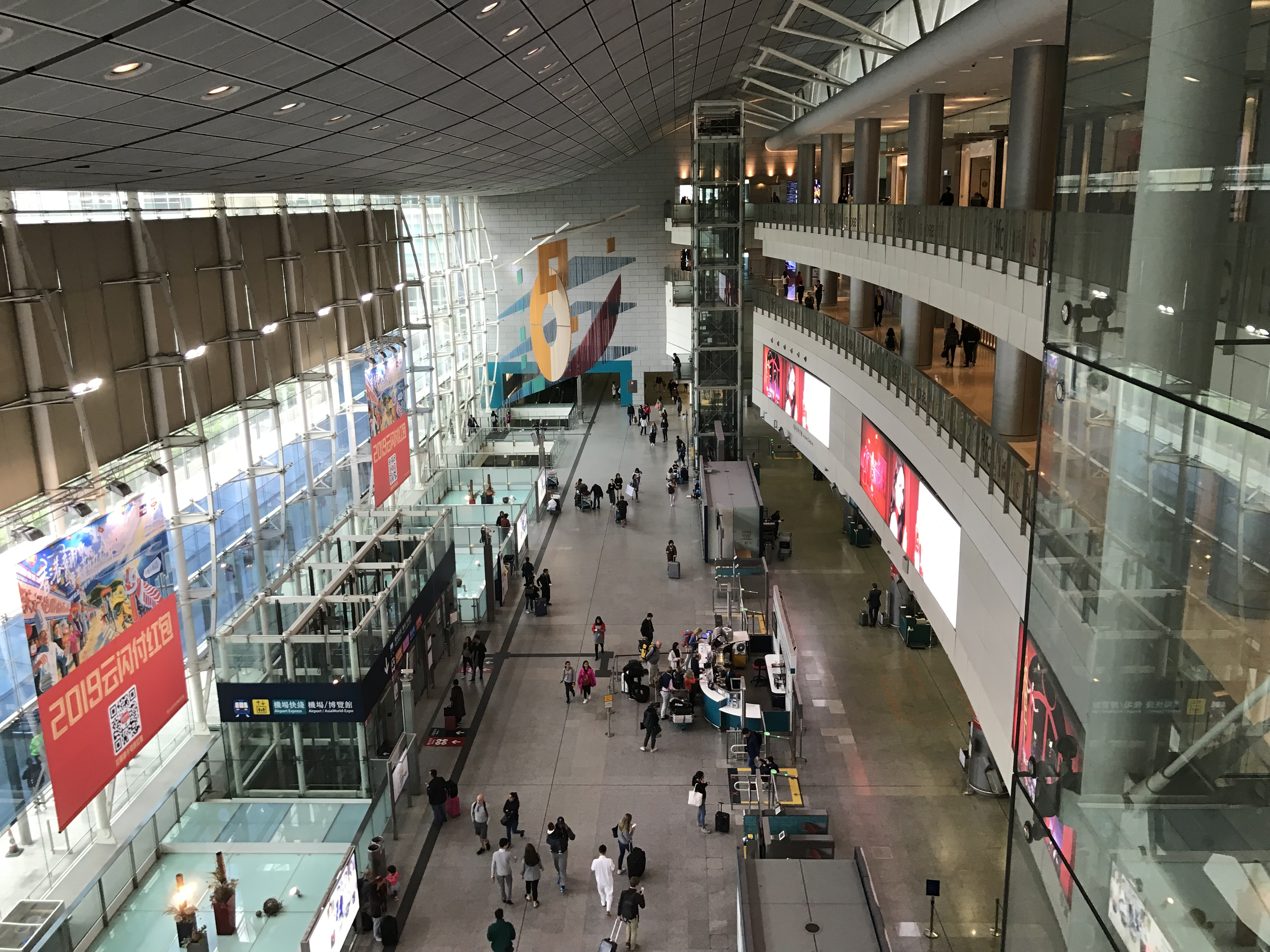
- Station concourse in February 2019

Chinese name
- Chinese: 香港
- Cantonese Yale: Hēunggóng
- Literal meaning: Fragrant harbour
Transcriptions
Standard Mandarin
- Hanyu Pinyin: Xiānggǎng
Yue: Cantonese
- Yale Romanization: Hēunggóng
- IPA: [hœ̂ːŋkɔ̌ːŋ]
- Jyutping: Hoeng1gong2

General information
- Location: Harbour View Street; Central, Hong Kong Island, Hong Kong
- Coordinates: 22°17′06″N 114°09′29″E
- System: MTR rapid transit station
- Owner: MTR Corporation
- Operator: MTR Corporation
- Lines: Tung Chung line; Airport Express
- Platforms: 4; Tung Chung line : 1 island platform; Airport Express : 1 side platform
- Tracks: 4
- Connections: Central: Tsuen Wan line; Island line; Bus, minibus; Tram; Ferries to Tsim Sha Tsui and Outlying Islands

Construction
- Structure type: Underground
- Platform levels: 3
- Accessible: Yes
- Architect: Arup Group, Rocco Design Architects

Other information
- Station code: HOK

History
- Opened: Tung Chung line : 22 June 1998; 28 years ago; Airport Express : 6 July 1998; 28 years ago
- Electrified: 1,500 V DC (Overhead line)
- Former names: Central North

Services
Preceding station	MTR	Following station
Terminus	Airport Express	Kowloon towards Airport or AsiaWorld-Expo
Terminus	Tung Chung line	Kowloon towards Tung Chung
Transfer at Central
Terminus	Tsuen Wan line transfer at Central	Admiralty towards Tsuen Wan
Sheung Wan towards Kennedy Town	Island line transfer at Central	Admiralty towards Chai Wan
Proposed
Tamar Terminus	Tung Chung line (North Island line)	Kowloon towards Tung Chung West
Route map
Location
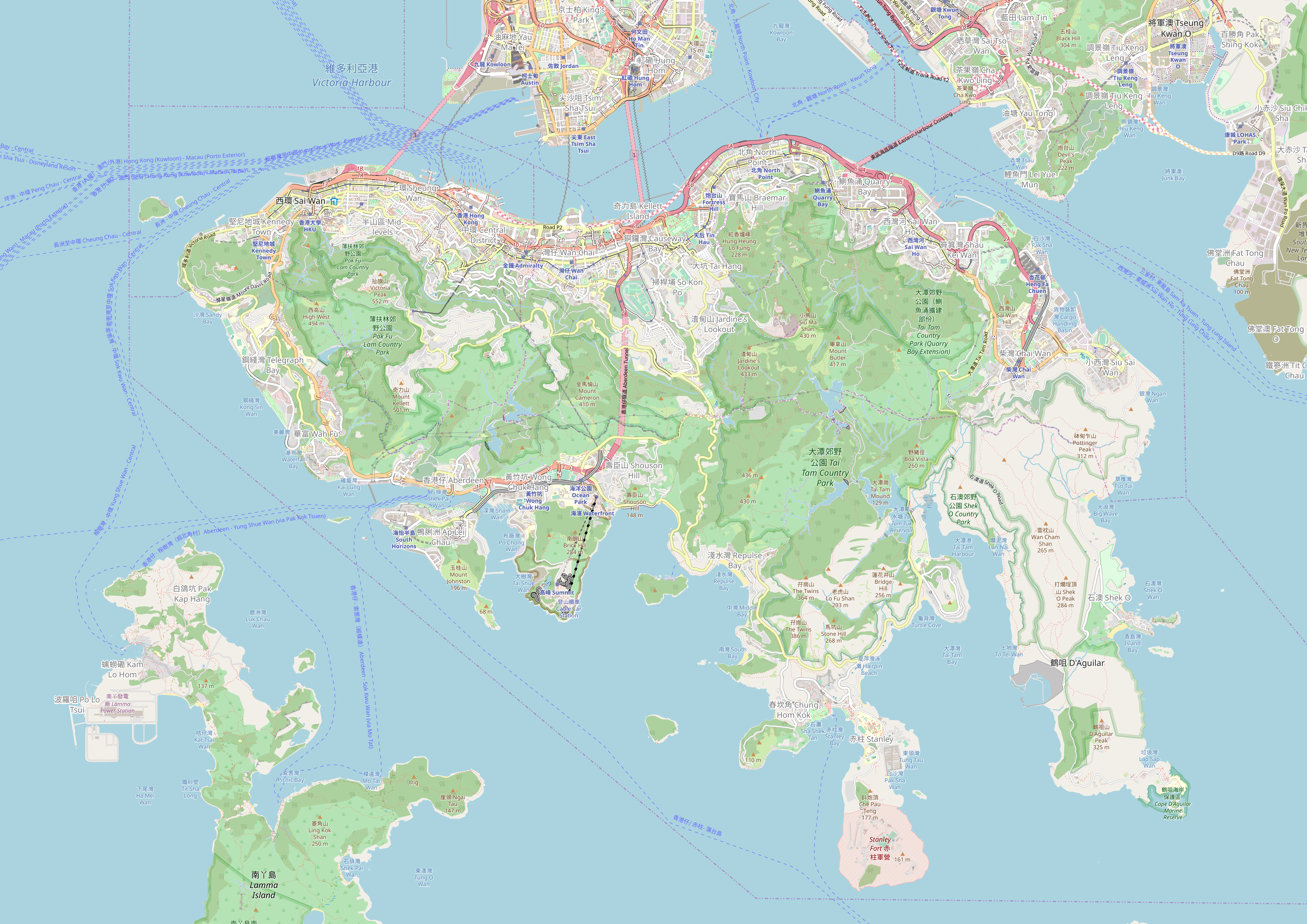
- Location within MTR Location within Hong Kong urban core Location within Hong Kong Island

Hong Kong (Chinese: 香港; Cantonese Yale: Hēunggóng) is a station of the MTR metro system in Hong Kong. It is the eastern terminus of the Tung Chung line and Airport Express. It is situated between Man Cheung Street and Harbour View Street, Central, Hong Kong Island, and sits underneath the International Finance Centre (IFC). It opened on 22 June 1998. Its livery is grey.

The station is connected to Central by a pedestrian subway. The walk between the two stations typically takes three to six minutes. The tunnels, which cross under Connaught Road Central, are equipped with moving walkways. Hong Kong station provides an in-town check-in service for flights departing Hong Kong International Airport and free shuttle bus services to most major hotels in the Central and Wan Chai areas.

== History ==
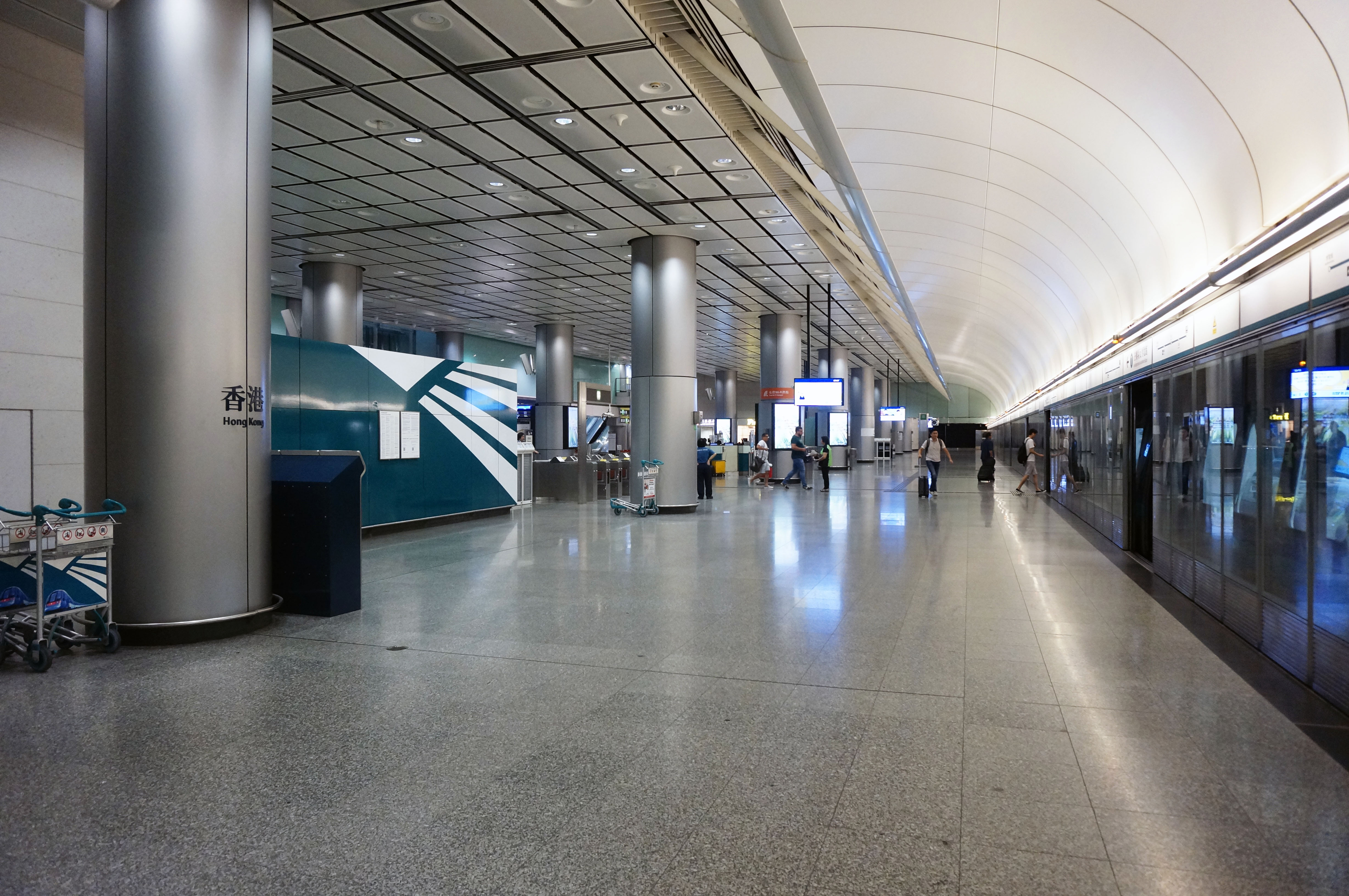
Platform 1 (Airport Express) in July 2017

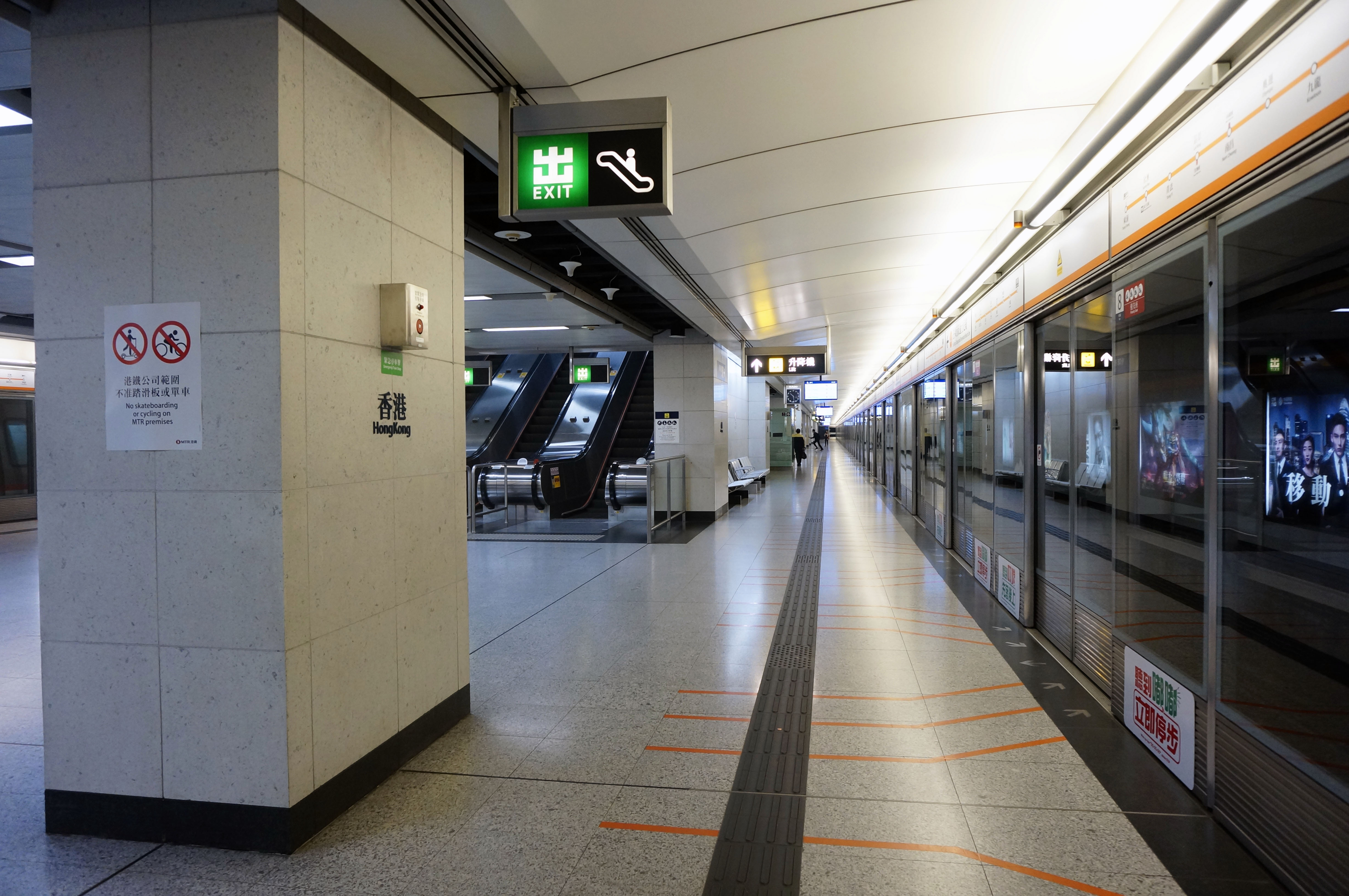
Platform 4 (Tung Chung line) in May 2017

Built as part of the Airport Railway project of the Airport Core Programme, Hong Kong station sits on land reclaimed from Victoria Harbour in the early 1990s. The construction contract (numbered 501) was awarded to Japanese contractor Aoki Corporation and began on 12 June 1995.

The station was designed by the Hong Kong office of Arup Associates in collaboration with Rocco Design Architects and Ove Arup and Partners. The engineering company Meinhardt Group designed the building services while Davis Langdon and Seah were cost consultants.

Hong Kong chief executive Tung Chee-hwa formally opened the Airport Railway by unveiling a plaque in the Hong Kong station concourse on 21 June 1998. The station opened for passenger service with the Tung Chung line on 22 June 1998. Airport Express service began on 6 July 1998, the same day the new Chek Lap Kok Airport opened.

== Overrun tunnel ==
The Airport Railway Extended Overrun Tunnel, envisaged to be 500 metres (1,600 ft) upon completion, would extend the Tung Chung line and Airport Express tracks to the east of Hong Kong station. Such a tunnel would allow trains to change tracks at a crossover east of the station, rather than using the current crossover west of the station, thereby speeding up train turnaround times and increasing the overall capacity of the rail lines by allowing more trains to be run.

In 2011, under the Central Reclamation Phase III project, a 40-metre (130 ft) section of the tunnel was built. The remaining 460-metre section of the tunnel, along with a new ventilation building near Tamar Park, was proposed in 2020. At that time, it was anticipated that the tunnel would be commissioned in 2032.

== Station layout ==
P1	Overlying properties	Exits; IFC Mall, One ifc, Two ifc Footbridge to Central; Mid-levels escalator system, Star Ferry Pier
G	Airport Express Check-in	Exits, Customer Service, MTRShops, Washrooms; Vending machines, Automatic teller machines Luggage check-in Carpark, Drop-off area
L1; Shops	Shops	Shops, vending machine Subway to carpark, escalators to Tung Chung line concourse
L2; Upper Platforms	Side platform, not in service
L2; Upper Platforms	Platform 2	No service, reserved platform
L2; Upper Platforms	Platform 1	← Airport Express towards Airport and AsiaWorld–Expo (Kowloon)
L2; Upper Platforms	Side platform, doors will open on the right
L2; Upper Platforms	Airport Express; Concourse	Exits, Customer Service, MTRShops, Washrooms; Hang Seng Bank, vending machines, ATMs; Taxi Stand, Airport Express shuttle buses
L2; Upper Platforms	Douglas Street; Concourse	Exit C, Customer Service
L3Ticket Hall	Tung Chung line Concourse	Customer Service, MTRShops; Vending machines, ATMs; Octopus card promotion machine
L3Ticket Hall	Interchange passageway	Interchange passageway to Douglas Street Concourse and Central
L4; Lower Platforms	Platform 4	← Tung Chung line towards Tung Chung (Kowloon)
L4; Lower Platforms	Island platform, doors will open on the left or right
L4; Lower Platforms	Platform 3	← Tung Chung line towards Tung Chung (Kowloon)

Although two Airport Express platforms have been constructed, only Platform 1 is in use. For the convenience of passengers, a taxi rank and a hotel shuttle service are provided on the same level once the passenger has exited through the gates.

The Tung Chung line and Airport Express are located considerably far away from each other. The Tung Chung line concourse is located one level below the Airport Express platform. There, passengers have to take an escalator or elevator down one additional level to access the Tung Chung line trains. In addition, passengers transferring from the Tung Chung line (or other MTR lines at Central) to Airport Express line or vice versa need to exit the paid area and reenter through the designated Airport Express fare gates or vice versa. If necessary, passengers seeking to transfer between Airport Express and the other lines serving Hong Kong and Central stations must purchase another ticket or top up their Octopus card to cover the cost of the next leg.

In July 2007, MTR installed two "Self-service Point" machines, for the first time in Hong Kong, at the Tung Chung line platform. These unstaffed machines help resolve passengers' issues such as having lost the ticket or being unable to use the Octopus card to exit. They also have a visual conference system so that the staff can assist passengers remotely.

=== Entrances and exits ===
- A1/A2: Two IFC
- B1/B2: Exchange Square I/II
- C: Douglas Street
- D: Exchange Square III
- E1/E3: One IFC
- F: IFC Mall

== Gallery ==
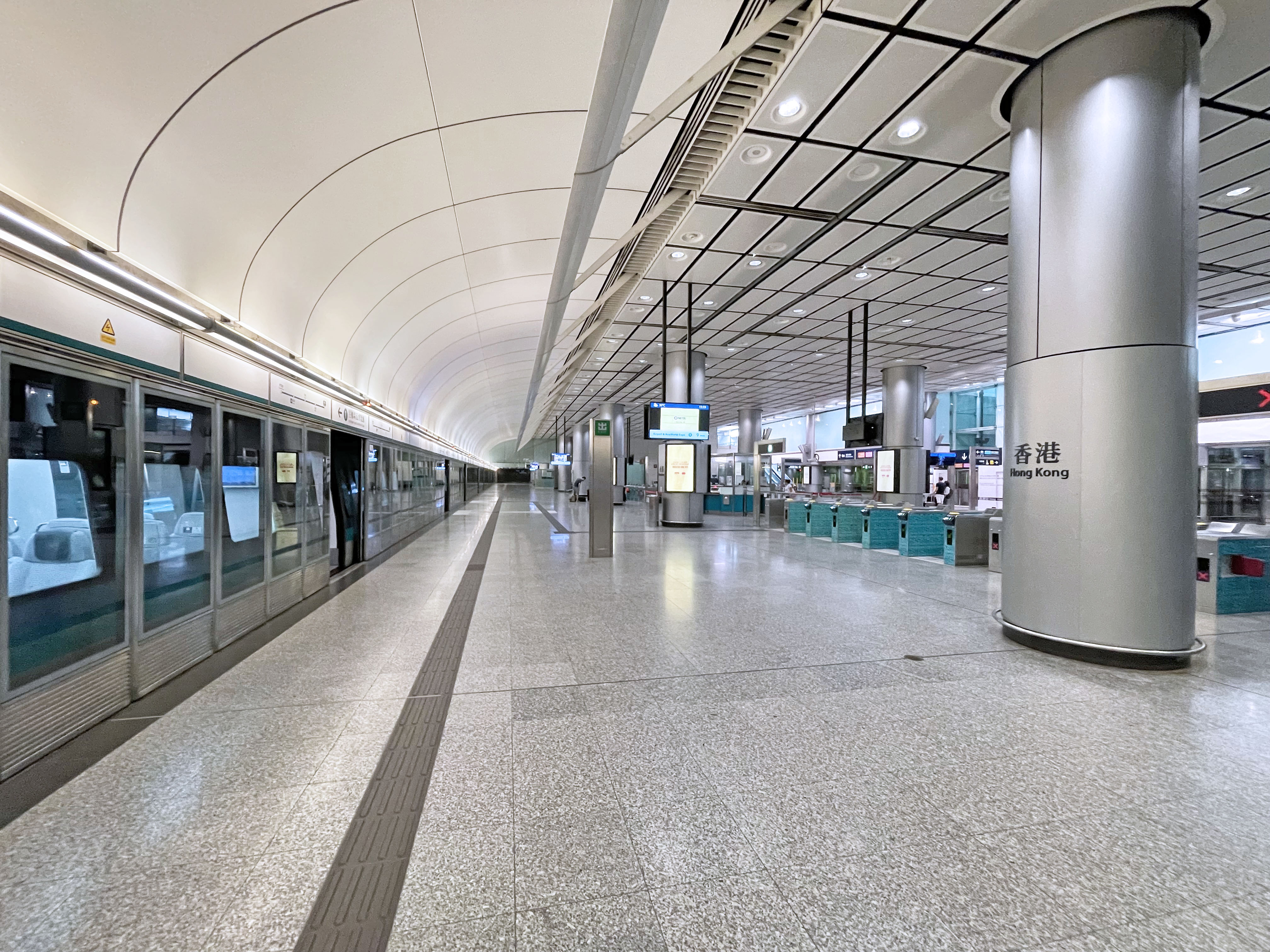
Airport Express platform

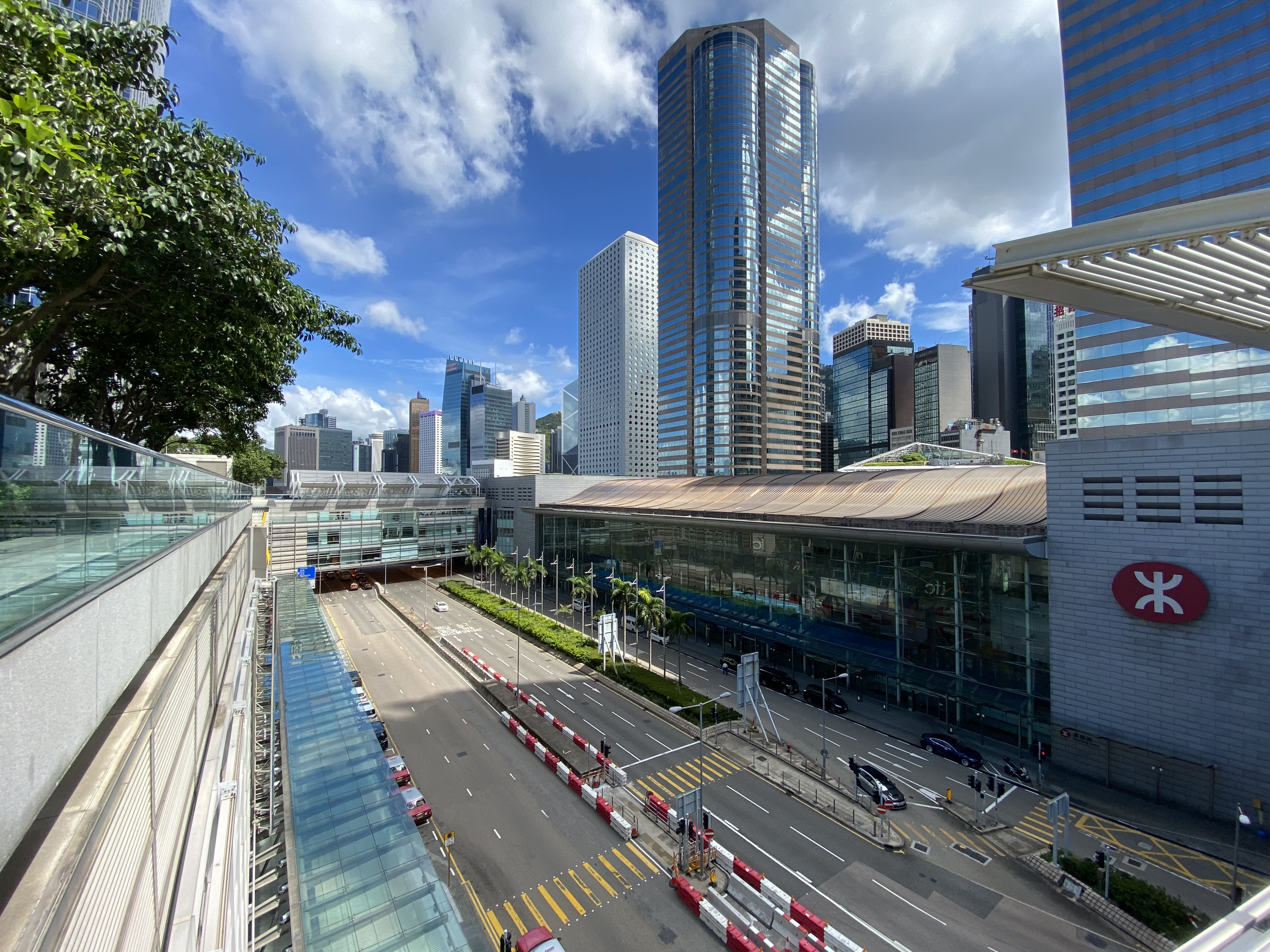
Station Exterior

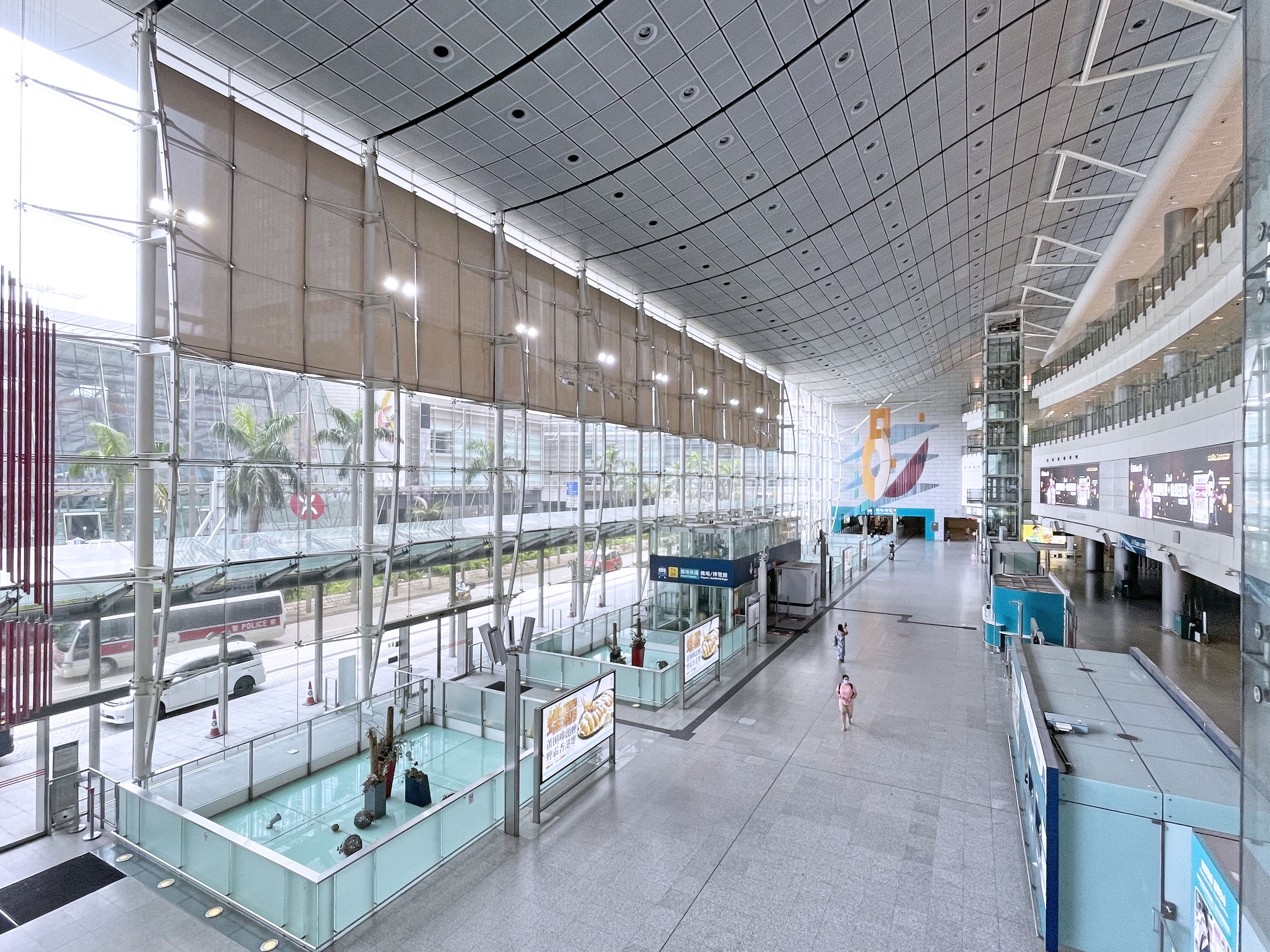
Airport Express Concourse

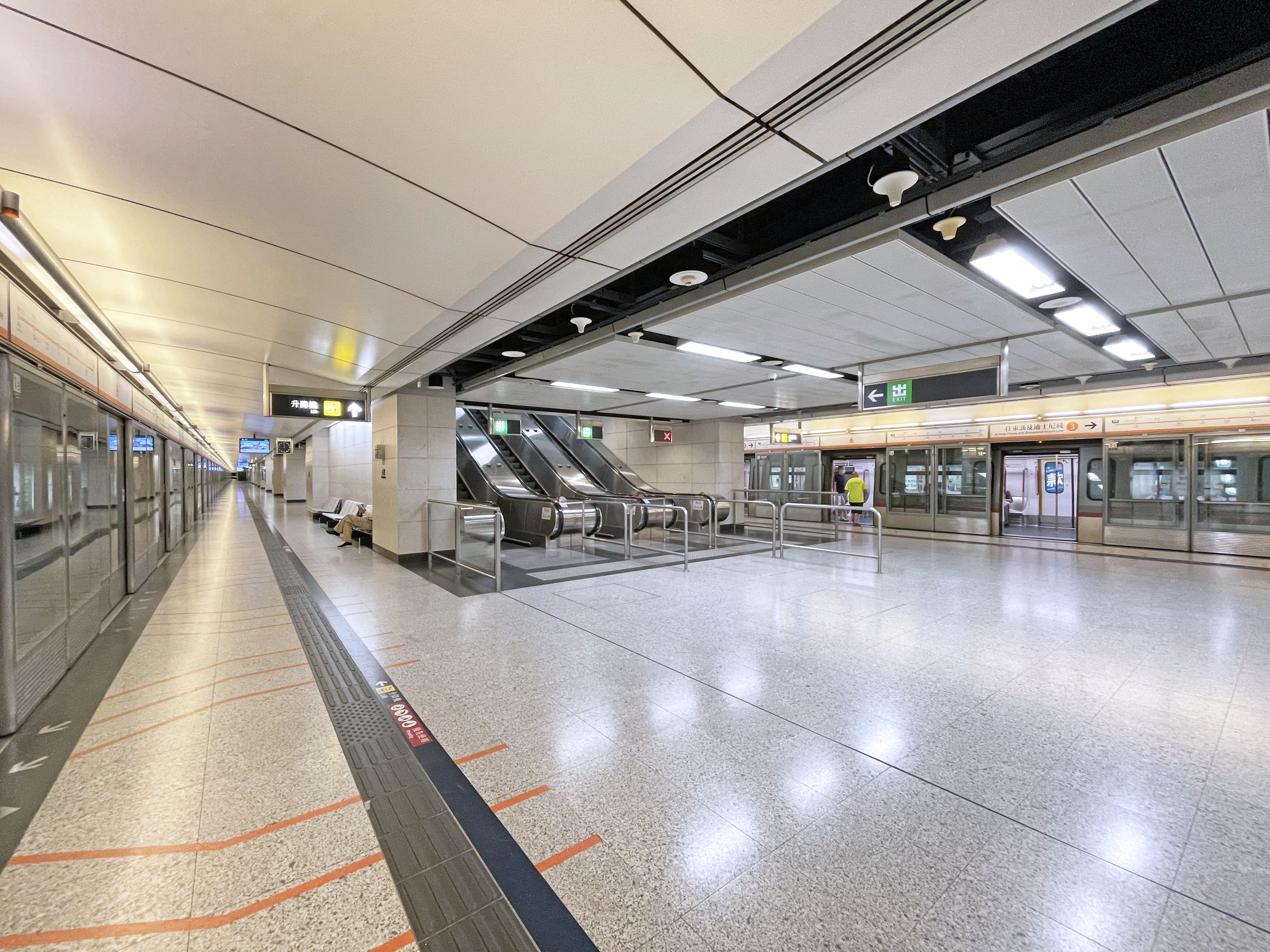
Tung Chung line platforms

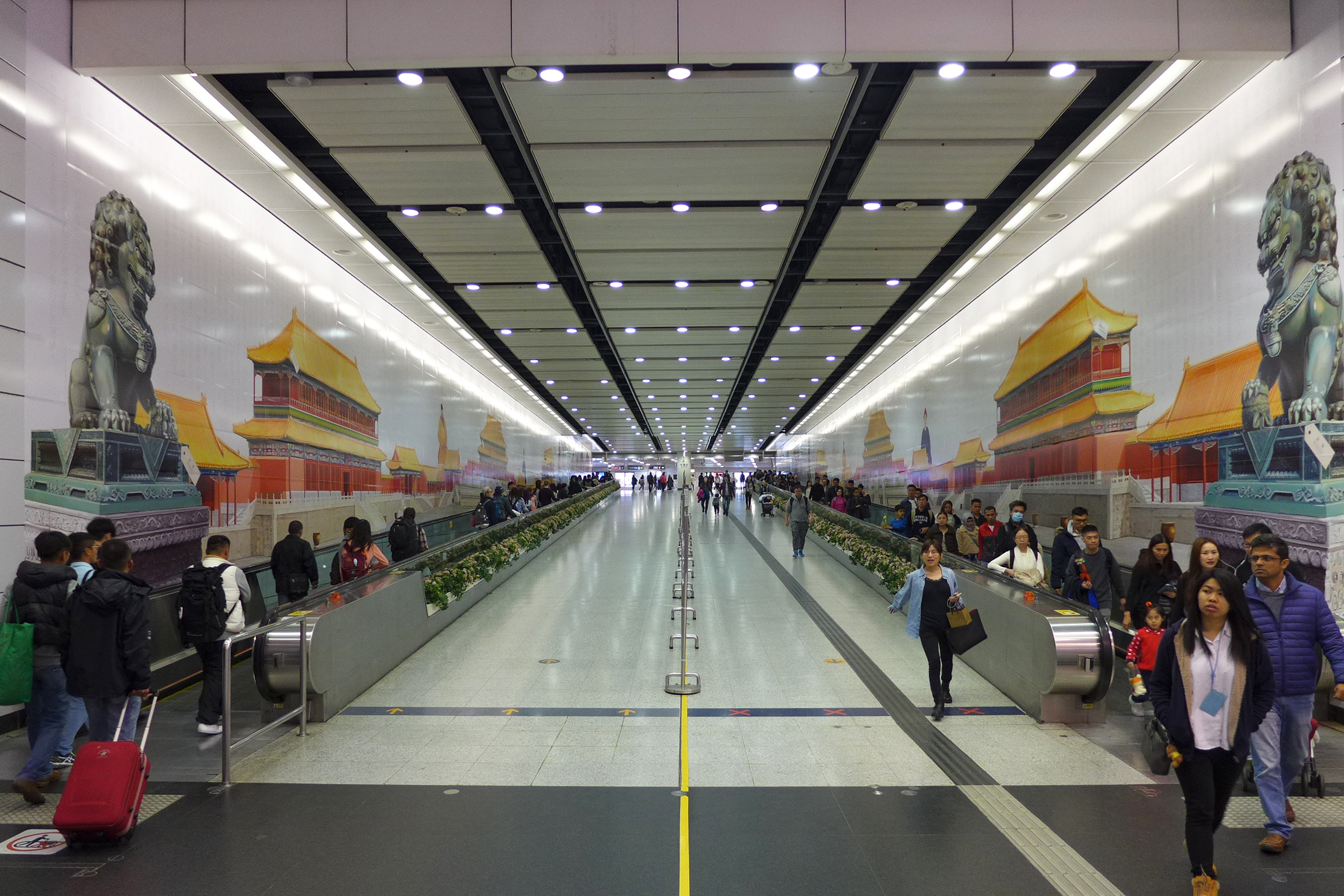
Passageway to Central station (2017)
