= Ronald Lu and Partners =

Hong Kong architecture and interior design firm

- Traditional Chinese: 呂元祥建築師事務所
- Simplified Chinese: 吕元祥建筑师事务所
- Literal meaning: Lu Yuan Auspicious/Propitious Architectural Firm
Transcriptions
Standard Mandarin
- Hanyu Pinyin: Lǚ Yuán Xiáng Jiànzhùshī Shìwùsuǒ
Yue: Cantonese
- Jyutping: leoi5 jyun4 coeng4 gin3 zuk1 si1 si6 mou6 so2

Ronald Lu & Partners (RLP, Chinese: 呂元祥建築師事務所) is a Hong Kong architecture and interior design firm founded by Ronald Lu in 1976. The practice provides architecture, interior design and master planning services in various sectors including culture and community, education, mix-used, commercial, residential, hotel and retail and transit-oriented development.

It is headquartered in Wan Chai, Hong Kong, with offices in Beijing, Shanghai, Guangzhou and Shenzhen as well as an office in Taipei, Taiwan.

== History ==
Ronald Lu & Partners was established in 1976, founded by Ronald Lu in Hong Kong. It is a design-led firm providing services mainly in architectural design, interior design and master planning. It first started with small housing projects and now participates in various large-scaled, mix-used developments locally and internationally. Projects include West Kowloon Cultural District Conceptual Plan, Chinese Opera House, revitalisation of the Peak Tower, Hong Kong Disneyland Hotel, City University of Hong Kong Academic Building III, China Resources Building, Hong Cheng Plaza Guangzhou and Shanghai Minhang Xinzhuang Comprehensive Development. RLP now has over 550 staff across its Hong Kong headquarters and four mainland China offices in Beijing, Shanghai, Guangzhou and Shenzhen.

== Notable projects ==
=== West Kowloon Cultural District, Conceptual Plan ===
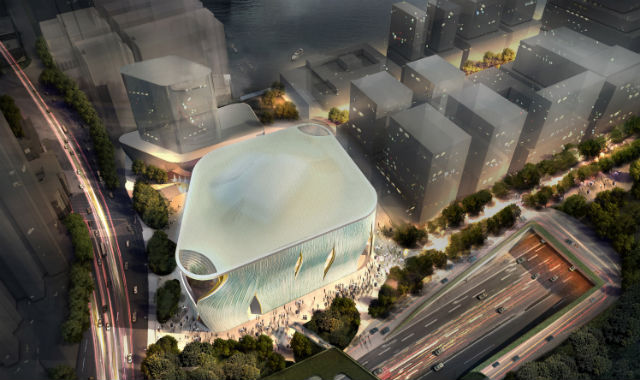
Xiqu Centre at West Kowloon Cultural District

Located at the wedge-shaped waterfront reclaimed land west of Yau Ma Tei, the West Kowloon Cultural District is an area of 40 hectares, featuring cultural and recreational, public, commercial and residential uses. A 23 hectare public park at the tip provides green open space for the city in a similar fashion style to Hyde Park or Central Park. RLP has worked in collaboration with Foster + Partners as local consultant to produce the winning conceptual master plan for the West Kowloon Cultural District, selected through international competition in April 2011.

=== Xiqu Centre, Hong Kong ===
Bing Thom Architects and Ronald Lu & Partners works with the West Kowloon Cultural District Authority to design the centre for preservation, development and promotion of the important art form of Chinese cultural heritage in Hong Kong. Occupying a prime site of 13,800 square metres at the eastern edge of the district, the centre contains 2,000 square metres of training and education facilities, two auditoria with 1,100 and 400 seats and a traditional tea house for performances with up to 200 seats. The project is scheduled for commission in the end of 2016.

=== Zero Carbon Building (ZCB) ===
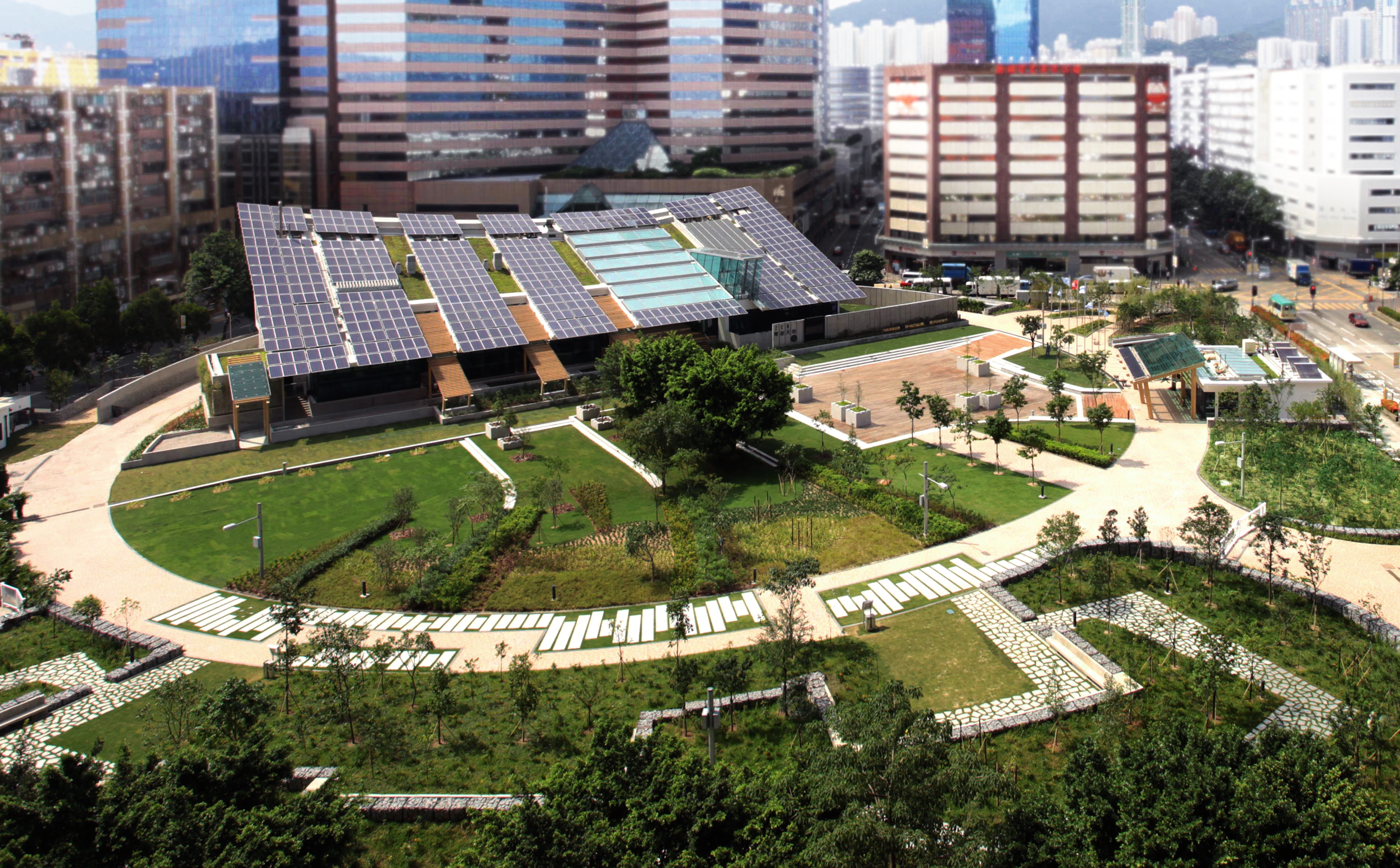
Zero Carbon Building (ZCB), Kowloon Bay, Hong Kong

ZCB, a joint project of Ronald Lu & Partners and the Construction Industry Council and Development Bureau, is the first zero carbon building in Hong Kong, built in 2012 on Sheung Yuet Road, Kowloon Bay Industrial Area. It costs HKD $240 million, covering a total area of 14,700 square metres of land, comprising a three-storey building and a landscape area. It houses seven zones: indoor exhibition and education area, eco-home, eco-office, eco-café, multi-purpose hall, eco-plaza, outdoor exhibition areas and Hong Kong’s first urban native woodland. 90% of the site area covers with plants, served as recreational use, 60% of which is planted with local vegetation.

=== Maggie’s Cancer Caring Centre ===
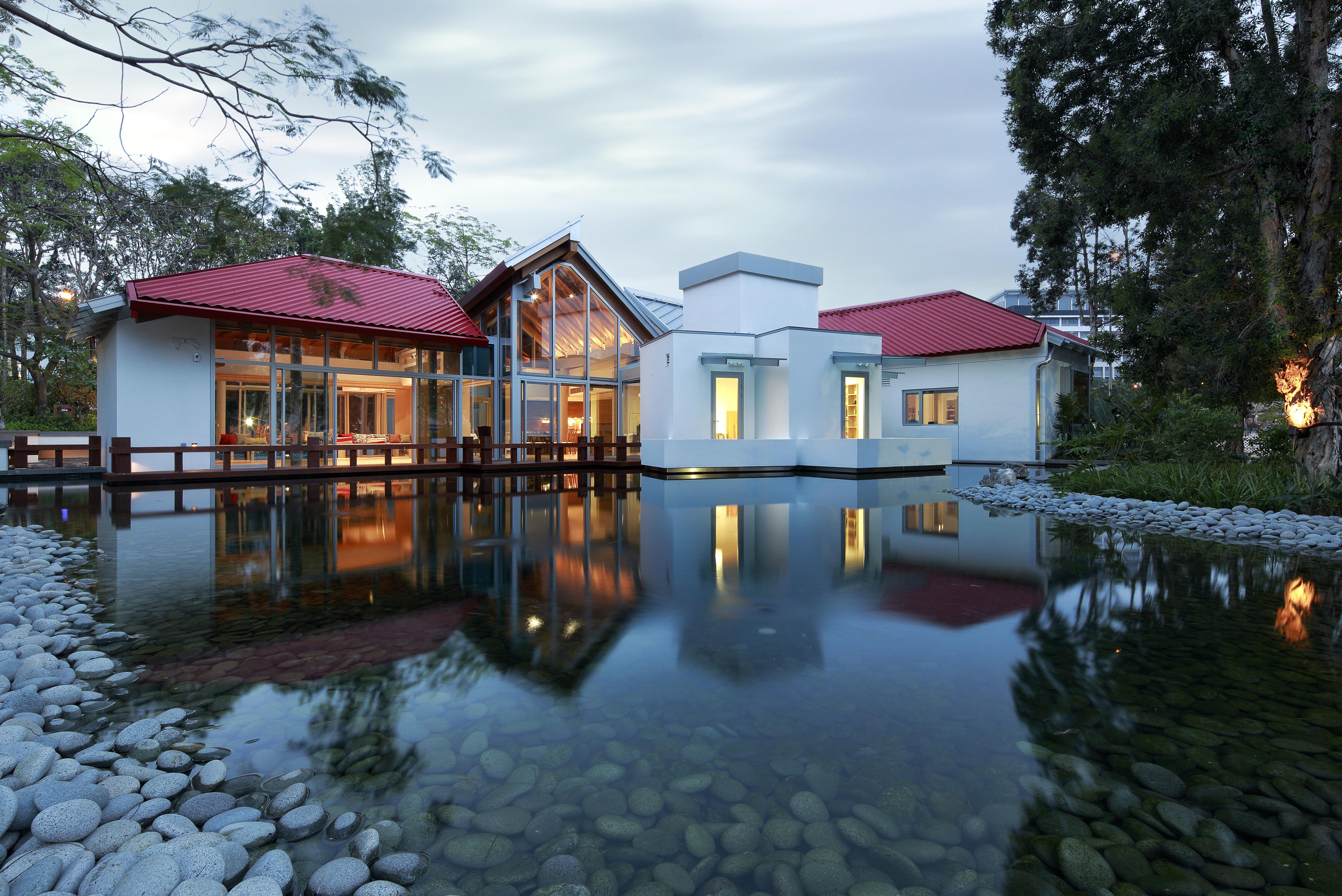
Maggie's Cancer Caring Centre, Tuen Mun, Hong Kong

Maggie’s Cancer Caring Centre Hong Kong is located in Tuen Mun Hospital, and is the first counselling facility of this kind outside the United Kingdom.

== Awards ==
- BEAM Plus Provisional “Platinum”, HKGBC
- BEAM Platinum Awards, HKGBC
- The Ring ic@ward International Interior Design
- Champion of HKIE Innovation Award 2012/2013
- Perspective Global Awards
- Asia Pacific Interior Design Award 2012
- Green Building Award 2012
- Hong Kong BIM Awards
- Quality Building Award 2012
- The American Institute of Architects Hong Kong Awards
- The Hong Kong Institute of Architects Awards
- MIPIM Asia Award 2013
- BCI Asia Top 10 Architects 2024 Award
