= Rail transport in Hong Kong =

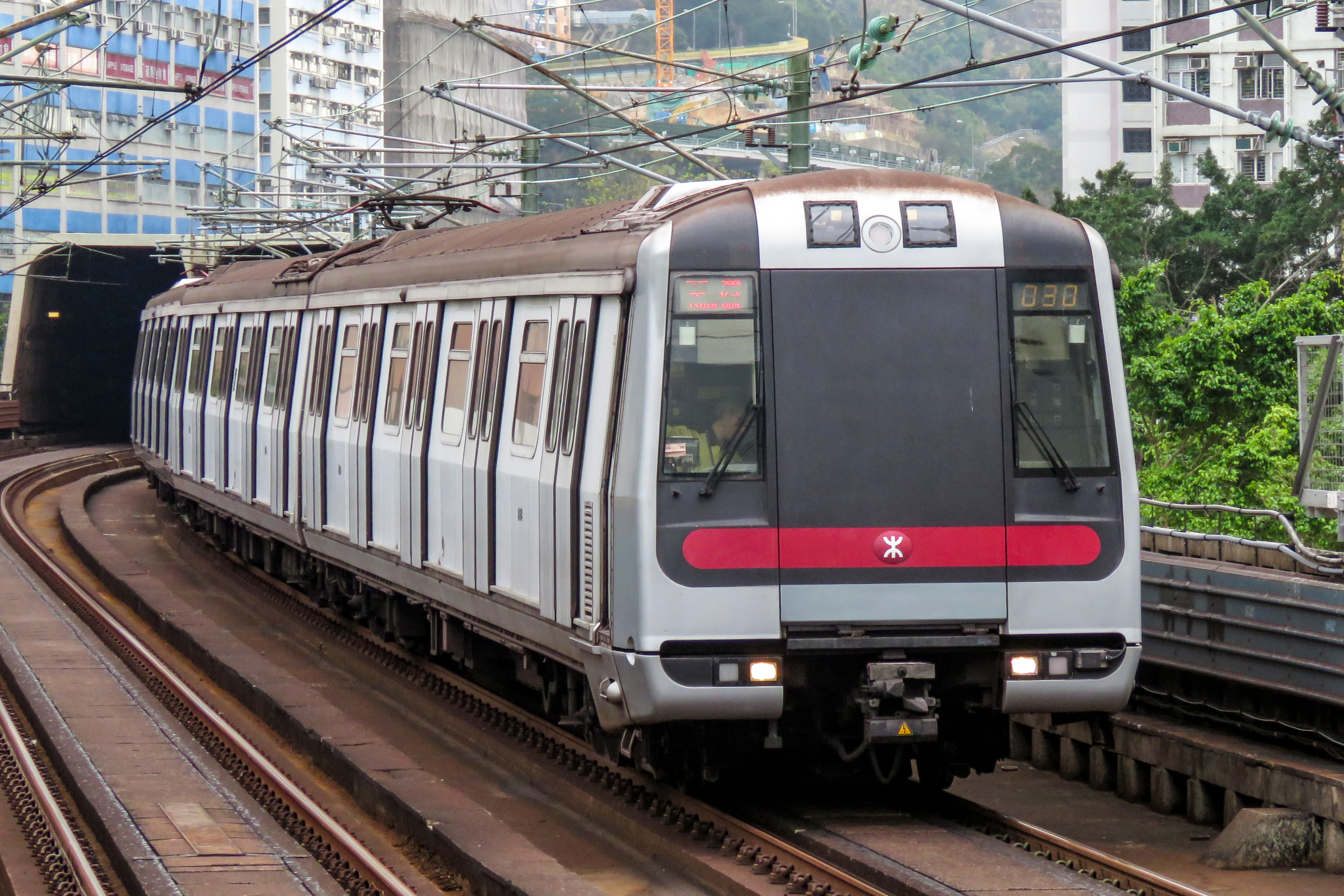
A Metro Cammell electric multiple unit running on the Tsuen Wan line

Hong Kong's rail network mainly comprises public transport trains operated by the MTR Corporation Limited (MTRC). The MTRC operates the metro network of the territory, the commuter rail network connecting the northeastern, northwestern and southwestern New Territories to the urban areas, and a light rail network in northwestern New Territories. The operations of the territory's two leading railway companies, MTRC and the Kowloon-Canton Railway Corporation (KCRC), were merged in 2007 on grounds of economies of scale and cost effectiveness. The Hong Kong Government has an explicit stated transport policy of using railways as its transport backbone.

In addition to the MTR network, there are several smaller-scale railways run by different operators, including the Peak Tram and the Hong Kong Tramways, and other systems including the Disneyland Railroad and the Ocean Express.

== History ==
The first mode of rail transport for the public in Hong Kong was the Peak Tram, serving The Peak (at Victoria Gap), the Mid-Levels and the city centre since 1888. This was followed by the Mount Parker Cable Car in 1892, but this system was terminated in 1932 and dismantled. The tram started service along the northern coast of the Hong Kong Island in 1904. The British Section of the Kowloon–Canton Railway (later the KCR East Rail, and now the East Rail line), a conventional railway, was opened in 1910.

It was not until 1979 that a rapid transit system, the MTR, was opened. Three years later, the British Section of the Kowloon–Canton Railway began its transition towards electrification, which changed it into a commuter rail, and eventually providing rapid transit-like service. The Light Rail Transit (LRT, now the MTR Light Rail) began its operation in the Tuen Mun and Yuen Long new towns in 1988. The two railway companies, MTR Corporation Limited and Kowloon-Canton Railway Corporation, merged their operations in 2007 to form a single rapid transit network, with the KCRC granting the MTRCL a service concession to operate their KCR network.

In 2018, the Guangzhou-Shenzhen-Hong Kong High Speed Railway opened to connect Hong Kong with the Mainland Chinese high speed network through a 26-kilometre (16 mi) tunnel within Hong Kong to West Kowloon station. It has many train services to many Mainland Chinese cities such as Beijing, Guangzhou and Shenzhen, until service was suspended since midnight of 30 January 2020 amidst the coronavirus pandemic.

There are several extensions planned, such as Tung Chung West station and North Island line.

== Trams and funiculars ==
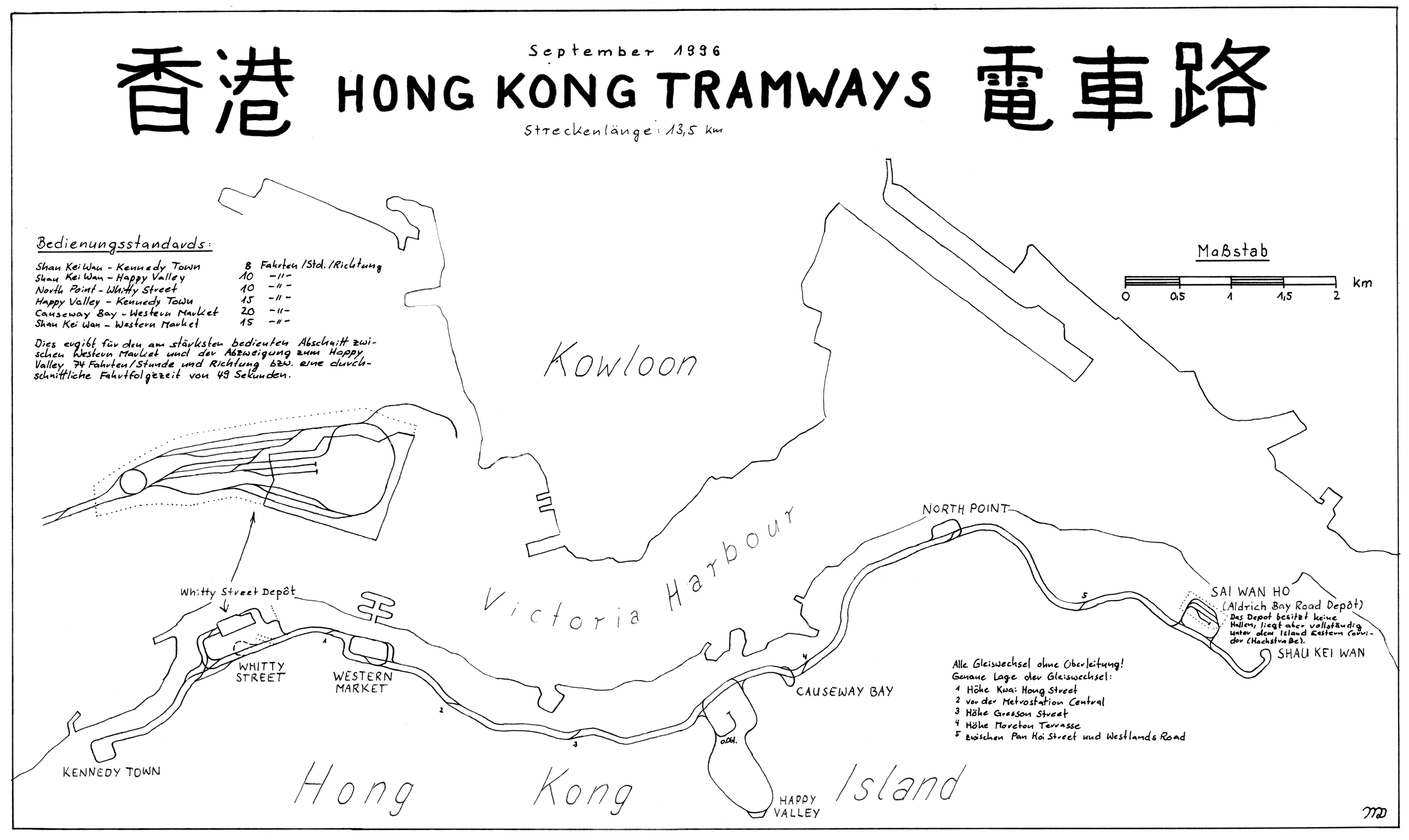
Hong Kong Tramways map

- Hong Kong Tramways: Double-decker trams, running on the north shore of Hong Kong Island from Kennedy Town to Shau Kei Wan.
- Light Rail: A light rail network in the Northwest New Territories with high floor vehicles and partial street running.
- Peak Tram: A funicular railway with six stations, connecting Central and the Victoria Peak.
- Po Fook Hill Elevator: A funicular railway with two stations, connecting the car park and the upper section of Po Fook Hill Cemetery.
- Discovery Bay Elevator: A funicular railway with two stations, connecting Discovery Bay North Plaza and Amalfi.
- Ocean Express‌
- Between Tai Wo Hau Road and Wo Tong Tsui Street in Kwai Chung

== MTR ==
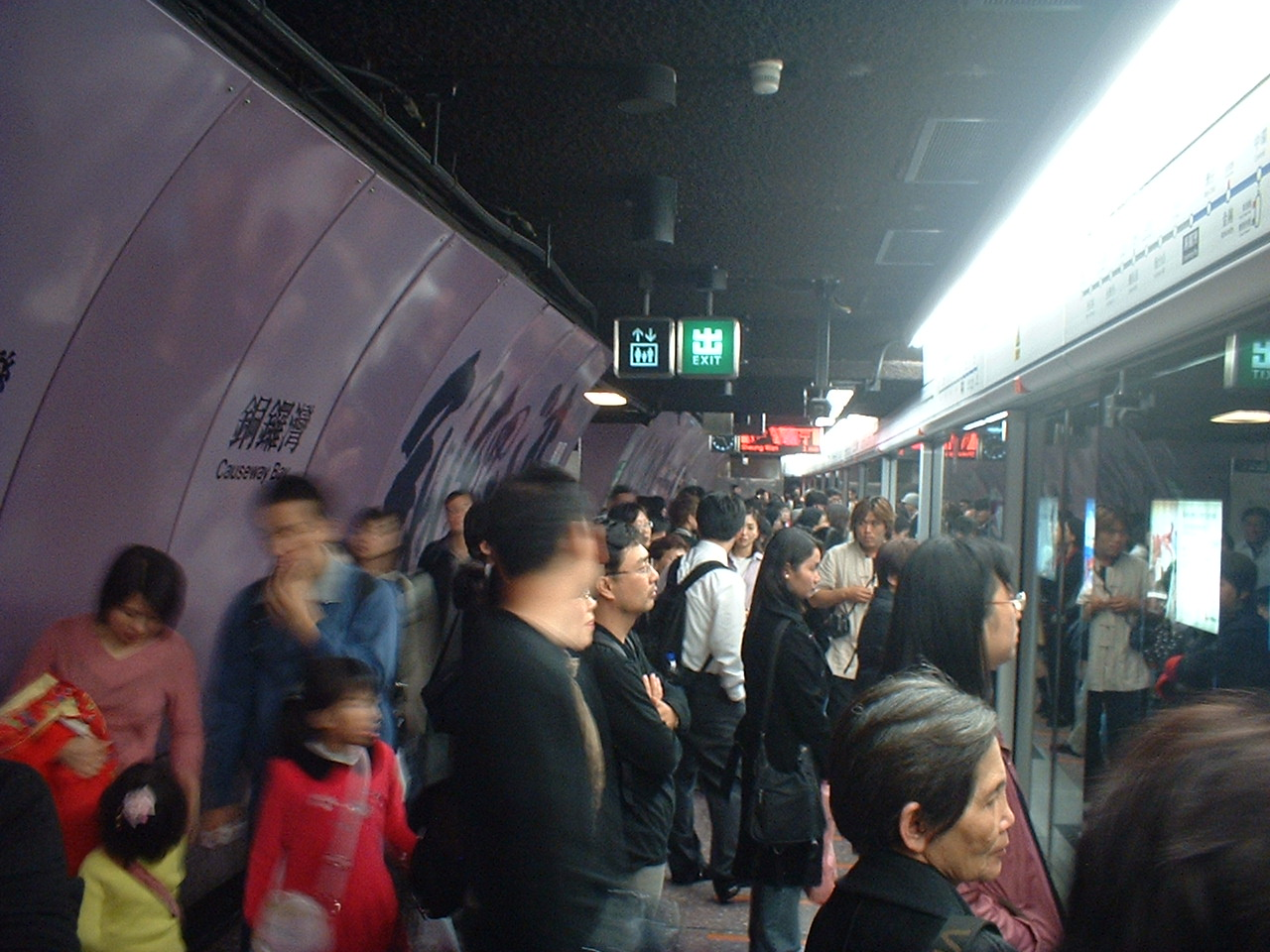
Causeway Bay MTR station on the Island line

Including lines owned and most of which previously operated by the KCR Corporation, the MTR network for local service comprises 10 heavy rail lines with 97 railway stations and one light rail network with 68 stops:

- East Rail line: between Lo Wu/Lok Ma Chau and Admiralty (formerly part of KCR/KCRC)
- Kwun Tong line: between Whampoa and Tiu Keng Leng
- Tsuen Wan line: between Tsuen Wan and Central
- Island line: between Kennedy Town and Chai Wan
- South Island line: between Admiralty and South Horizons
- Tung Chung line: between Tung Chung and Hong Kong
- Tseung Kwan O line: between Po Lam/LOHAS Park and North Point
- Disneyland Resort line: between Sunny Bay and Disneyland Resort
- Tuen Ma line: between Wu Kai Sha to Tuen Mun (formerly part of KCR/KCRC for Wu Kai Sha to Tai Wai section, and Hung Hom to Tuen Mun section; remainder owned by the government through the KCRC following an injection of assets)
- Airport Express: between AsiaWorld-Expo/Airport and Hong Kong
- Light Rail: a light rail network with 11 lines and 68 stops serving the northwest New Territories (formerly part of KCR/KCRC)

This system makes about HK$2 billion in profit in 2014 which is mainly generated from its property holding and development business. Its portfolio include two of the city's tallest skyscrapers.

== Cross-border services ==
=== Through trains ===
Commonly known as through train (chi. 直通車), the MTRC and railway companies of mainland China jointly provided cross-border train services from Hung Hom station, Kowloon, sharing most of the tracks with the East Rail line, to destinations in mainland China through neighbouring Shenzhen on three Through Train routes, namely Beijing line (to/from Beijing West), Shanghai line (to/from Shanghai) and Guangdong line (to/from Guangzhou East); these services have been suspended since the beginning of the coronavirus pandemic from 30 January 2020 onwards. The Through Train service to Guangzhou (formerly Canton) was a legacy of Hong Kong's first railway, the Kowloon–Canton Railway. Outside Hong Kong it was operated through the rail network in mainland China, including the Guangshen railway, Jingguang railway and Hukun railway.

=== High speed rail ===
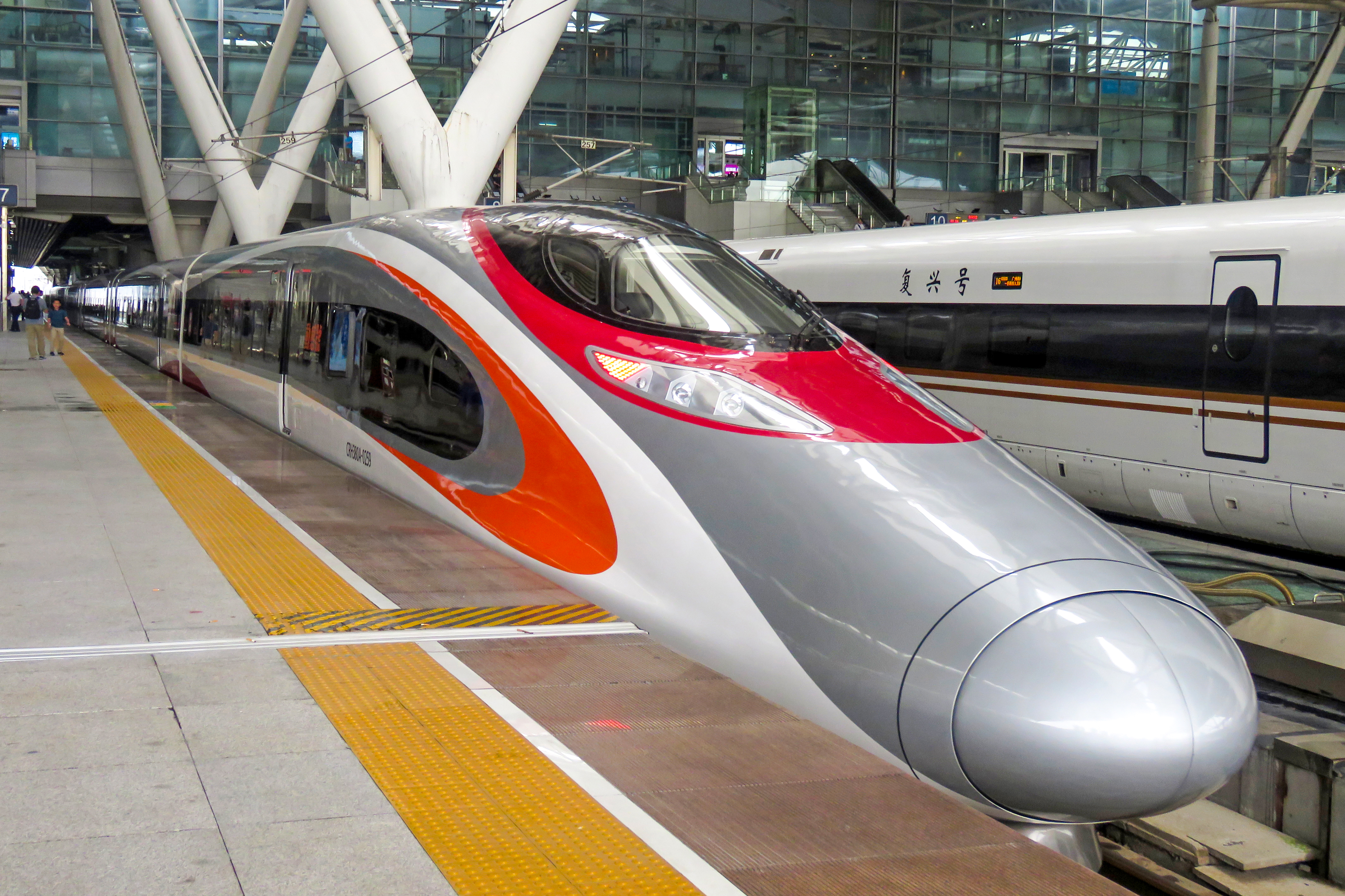
High speed train to Hong Kong departing Guangzhou South station

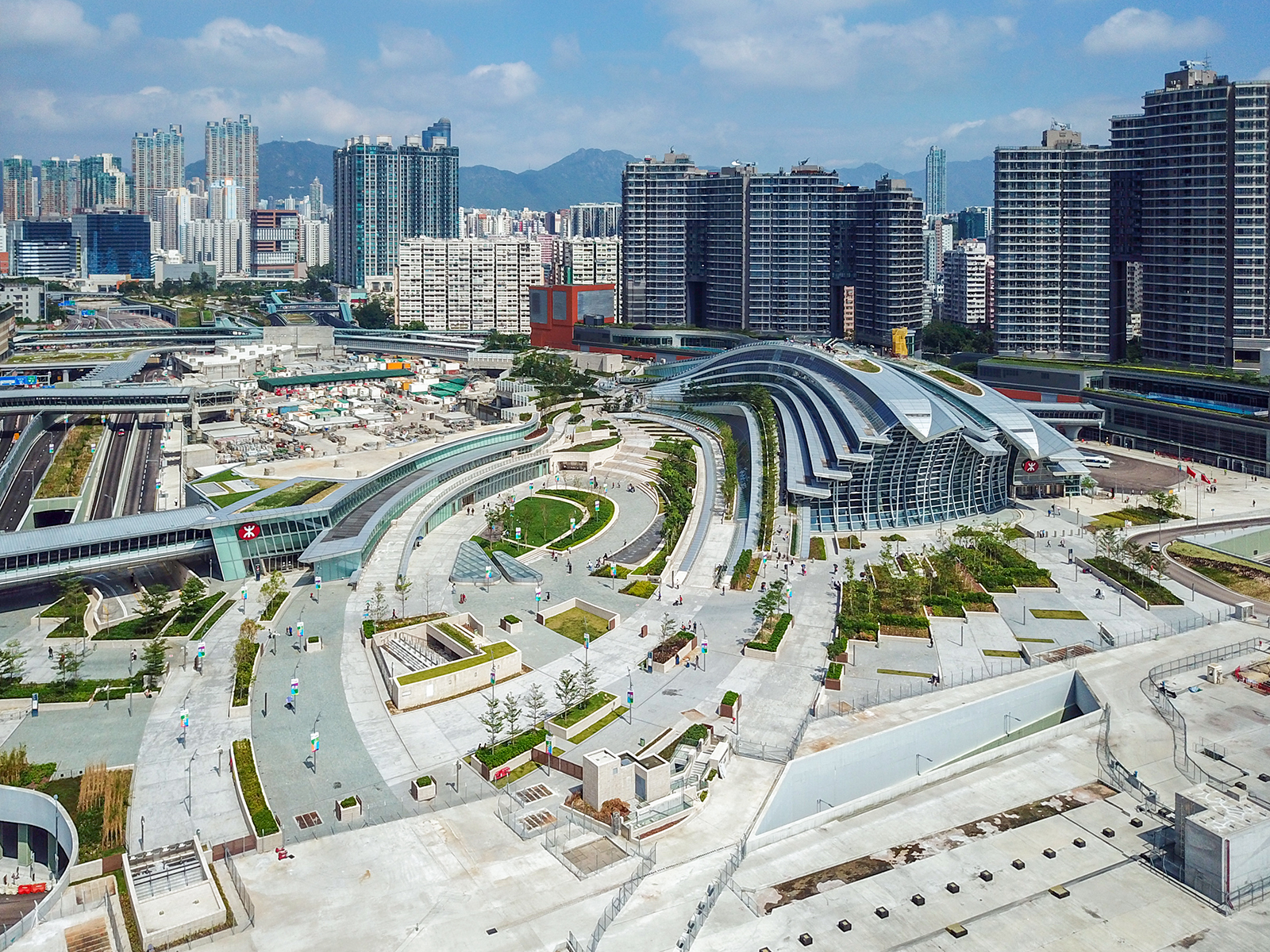
West Kowloon station in Hong Kong, adjacent to Kowloon station and Austin station

A high-speed rail link connects Hong Kong with Shenzhen and Guangzhou in mainland China. The Hong Kong section of the Guangzhou–Shenzhen–Hong Kong Express Rail Link (sometimes abbreviated "XRL HK section") is a 26-km long stretch of high-speed rail that links Hong Kong to mainland China. The Hong Kong section opened for commercial service on 23 September 2018. From West Kowloon Terminus, trains run through regional stations in Guangdong Province, including Futian, Longhua (Shenzhen North), and Humen, to Guangzhou South station and other cities in other provinces.

With the completion of the rail link, the journey times have been reduced to 14 minutes between West Kowloon and Futian stations, 23 minutes between Hong Kong and Shenzhen North and 48 minutes between Hong Kong and Guangzhou South. The service is a cooperation between the MTR Corporation and CR Guangzhou.

West Kowloon station is served by both short-distance and long-haul train services. Short-distance services consist of a frequent service to mainland Chinese cities in neighbouring Guangdong province, including Shenzhen, Dongguan and Guangzhou, while long-distance services link Hong Kong to at least 16 major destinations in mainland China, including Beijing West, Shijiazhuang, Zhengzhou East, Wuhan, Changsha South and Shanghai Hongqiao.

A new railway connecting Guangzhou, Shenzhen and Hong Kong was proposed in the late 1990s by the Government of Hong Kong. This Regional Express Railway (RER) proposal was developed in the 1994 “Railway Development Study” (RDS); it foresaw a continual growth of Hong Kong's population over the next two decades and strong demand for cross-border passenger traffic. By 2002, the concept of “regional express” gained further development and the proposal was advanced to be a high-speed rail line. Construction of the Hong Kong section began in 2010. Following delays and controversies, West Kowloon station was formally opened on 4 September 2018 and high speed trains started to run on the rail link to destinations in Mainland China from 23 September 2018.

Station Name English	Station Name Chinese	Total Distance	Transfer	Location
Hong Kong West Kowloon	香港西九龍 / 香港西九龙		Tung Chung line Airport Express (via Kowloon); Tuen Ma line (via Austin)	Yau Tsim Mong, Hong Kong

A second cross-border express railway, the Hong Kong–Shenzhen Western Express Railway, was proposed in the 2000s but shelved amidst concern over costs and the environment. The shelved proposal has been revived in October 2021 by the territory's then Chief Executive.

== Higher-speed capacity ==
Apart from the XRL mentioned above, MTR's trainsets for the Guangdong service, namely Lok 2000 locomotives and its carriages the Ktt, are designed to be able to run at 200 kilometres per hour (120 mph) but do not operate at those speeds on the tracks of the East Rail. The SP1900 EMUs (IKK trains; in reference to the Itochu, Kinki Sharyo and Kawasaki consortium) on the Tuen Ma line and formerly on the East Rail may run at 160 kilometres per hour (99 mph) but also do not operate at those speeds on those lines.

== Automated People Mover ==
There is an Automated People Mover (APM), a driverless electric train service, which is located at the basement level of Terminal 1 of Hong Kong International Airport. It travels the length of the 750-metre (2,460 ft) concourse between the East Hall and West Hall on a circular mode. Running at a speed of 62 km per hour, each APM carries 304 passengers in four cars. The APM operates every 2.5 minutes from 0600 to 0030 hours every day. It transports passengers whose flights are located at the West Hall, Southwest and Northwest concourses.

An Automated People Mover was also proposed by the territory's Chief Executive to connect Tsim Bei Tsui, Lau Fau Shan and Pak Nai in northwestern New Territories by the Deep Bay.

== Other minor systems ==
- Ocean Park Cable Car‌
- Hong Kong Disneyland Railroad
- Ngong Ping 360 (a bicable gondola lift owned and operated by MTRCL)
- A track inside the Fire and Ambulance Services Academy

== Rail gauges and power supply ==
Rail gauges and power supply of Hong Kong rails.

Rail	Rail gauge	Power supply		Remarks	Signal system	Height of platform	Width of widest car (mm)	Loading gauge width (mm)	Height of tallest car (mm)	Height clearance	Height of contact wire (mm)
MTR Island line, South Island line, Kwun Tong line, Tseung Kwan O line, Tsuen Wan line (collectively Urban Lines except for South Island line)	1,432 mm (4 ft 8 3/8 in) (except for West Island line, South Island line, and Kwun Tong line extension) (almost standard gauge) 1435 mm (West Island line, South Island line, and Kwun Tong line extension)	1500 V DC	overhead cable		Urban Lines: SACEM and SACEM-SICAS for TKL, all lines to be upgraded to SelTrac in the 2020s South Island line: Alstom Urbalis 400	1100 mm (43.3 in)	3118	3250 (with fixed platform gap filler) 3312 (without gap filler) 3940 (without platform)	3700 (MTR Metro Cammell EMU (DC) without pantograph) 3910 (MTR Metro Cammell EMU (DC) with pantograph folded)	3755 mm (without pantograph) 4100 mm (with pantograph folded) (~4904 mm with pantograph folded in depots)	4200 mm (nominal and min., as built to same standards as Tung Chung line and Airport Express); (~5029 mm in depots)
MTR Tung Chung line, Airport Express (collectively known as Airport Railway)	1,432 mm (4 ft 8 3/8 in) (almost standard gauge)	1500 V DC (nominal); 1520 ± 20 V DC (in practice)	overhead cable		SACEM, all lines to be upgraded to SelTrac in the 2020s	1250 mm (49.2 in)	3118 (MTR Rotem EMU)	3250 (with fixed platform gap filler) 3312 (without gap filler) 3940 (without platform)	3700 (MTR Adtranz–CAF EMU without pantograph)	3755 mm (without pantograph) 4100 mm (with pantograph folded) (~4904 mm with pantograph folded in depots)	4200 mm (nominal and min.); 4224.78 mm (mean); 4230 mm (max. on running lines)(~5029 mm in depot)
MTR Disneyland Resort line	1,432 mm (4 ft 8 3/8 in) (almost standard gauge)	1500 V DC	overhead cable		SelTrac CBTC/R UTO	1100 mm (43.3 in)	3096	3250 (with fixed platform gap filler) 3312 (without gap filler) 3940 (without platform)	3700 (without pantograph) 3910 (with pantograph folded)	3755 mm (without pantograph) 4100 mm (with pantograph folded) (~4904 mm with pantograph folded in depots)	4200 mm (nominal and min., as built to same standards as Tung Chung line and Airport Express); (~5029 mm in depot) (note: depot shared with Airport Railway)
MTR East Rail line, Tuen Ma line (formerly operated by KCR/KCRC)	1,435 mm (4 ft 8 1/2 in) (Standard gauge)	25 kV AC	overhead cable	electrical supply same standard as railways in mainland China	East Rail line: Siemens Trainguard MT CBTC Tuen Ma line: SelTrac CBTC DTO	3 ft 6 in (1066.8mm)	3220 (MTR Hyundai Rotem EMU)	3250 (with fixed platform gap filler) 3300 (without gap filler) ~3900 (without platform)	4600 (Ktt Kinki Sharyo coach)	16 ft 6 in (5029.2 mm) (with pantograph folded)	17 ft 4 in (5283.2 mm) (nominal and minimum)
MTR Light Rail (formerly operated by KCR/KCRC)	1,435 mm (4 ft 8 1/2 in) (Standard gauge)	750 V DC	overhead cable		Siemens Trainguard IMU 100	910 mm (35.8 in)	2650	2670		5250 mm (with pantograph folded)	5300 mm (nominal and minimum)
Guangzhou-Shenzhen-Hong Kong Express Rail Link Hong Kong section	1,435 mm (4 ft 8 1/2 in) (Standard gauge)	25 kV AC	overhead cable	everything same standard as railways in mainland China		1250 mm (49.2 in)	3380	3400		5250 mm (with pantograph folded)	5300 mm (nominal and minimum)
Peak Tram	1,520 mm (4 ft 11 27/32 in) (Russian gauge)	N/A	N/A	Funicular							
Hong Kong Tramways	3 ft 6 in (1,067 mm)	550 V DC	overhead cable			N/A				20 ft 8 in (6299.2 mm) (with trolley pole folded) (estimated)	21 ft (6400.8 mm) (estimated)
Hong Kong International Airport Automated People Mover	N/A (Automated guideway transit)	3-phase 600 V AC	Third Rail		SelTrac						
Hong Kong Disneyland Railroad	3 ft (914 mm)	N/A		powered by three steam-shaped diesel locomotives							
Ocean Park Ocean Express	1,435 mm (4 ft 8 1/2 in) (Standard gauge)	N/A		Funicular							

== List of densely populated places without rail transport ==
- Hong Kong Island
  - Aberdeen
  - Wah Fu
  - Bel-Air (Cyberport)
  - Pok Fu Lam
  - Siu Sai Wan
- Kowloon
  - Most of Tai Wo Ping (Shek Kip Mei)
  - Tsz Wan Shan
  - Sau Mau Ping and Shun Lee
  - Most of Ma Tau Kok
- New Territories
  - Chai Wan Kok
  - Sheung Kwai Chung
  - Sai Kung
  - So Kwun Wat
  - Tsuen King Circuit
  - Parts of Tsing Yi

== MTR route map ==
MTR System Map with effect from 15 May 2022

== Former systems ==
- Mount Parker Cable Car
- Sha Tau Kok branch
- Wo Hop Shek branch
- Kai Tak Amusement Park Monorail
- Lai Chi Kok Amusement Park Monorail
- Miniature railway in Luna Park, Fortress Hill
- Tracks inside the Kowloon Wharves
- Tracks inside the Taikoo Dockyard
- Tracks inside the Whampoa Docks
- Cement works in To Kwa Wan
- Haematite mine at Ma On Shan
- Tracks in the Victoria Barracks
- Tracks near Tai Tam Tuk Raw Water Pumping Station
- Praya East Reclamation Railway
- Waglan Island
- Sham Shui Po Camp
- Dairy Farm Ropeway in Pok Fu Lam
- Nazareth House Ropeway in Pok Fu Lam

== See also ==
- Transport in Hong Kong § Rail transport
- List of railway lines in China
- Rail transport in China
- Rail transport in Macau
