= Track gauge in Hong Kong =

Various track gauges are used in Hong Kong on different railways and railway lines.

== Current use ==
=== Standard gauge ===
In Hong Kong, the ex-KCR East Rail line, the Tuen Ma line (combination of the 2 former ex-KCR West Rail and Ma On Shan lines), the ex-KCR Light Rail services, the West Island line, the Kwun Tong line extension and the South Island line use 1,435 mm (4 ft 8 1/2 in) standard gauge.

=== Almost-standard gauge ===
The Mass Transit Railway (MTR) lines (apart from the West Island line, Kwun Tong line extension and South Island line) that were not part of the Kowloon–Canton Railway (KCR) use the track gauge of 1,432 mm (4 ft 8 3/8 in), 3 mm (1/8 in) narrower than the standard gauge. This gauge is also used on the Bucharest Metro in Romania. It was formerly used by Nuremberg tramway before regauging to standard gange.

=== Narrow gauge ===
Hong Kong Tramways, which has been operating tram service on northern Hong Kong Island since 1904, uses a narrow gauge of 1,067 mm (3 ft 6 in).

== Rail gauge table ==
Rail gauge	Rail	Length (km)	Operator	Service period
610 mm (2 ft)	Sha Tau Kok Railway	11.67	KCR Corporation	1912–1928
914 mm (3 ft)	Hong Kong Disneyland Railroad	1.5	Hong Kong Disneyland	2005 – present
1,067 mm (3 ft 6 in)	Hong Kong Tramways	30	Hong Kong Tramways, Limited	1904 – present
1,432 mm (4 ft 8 3/8 in)	Kwun Tong line	18.4	MTR Corporation	1979 – present
1,432 mm (4 ft 8 3/8 in)	Tsuen Wan line	16	MTR Corporation	1982 – present
1,432 mm (4 ft 8 3/8 in)	Island line	16.3	MTR Corporation	1985 – present
1,432 mm (4 ft 8 3/8 in)	Tung Chung line	31.1	MTR Corporation	1998 – present
1,432 mm (4 ft 8 3/8 in)	Airport Express	35.3	MTR Corporation	1998 – present
1,432 mm (4 ft 8 3/8 in)	Tseung Kwan O line	12.3	MTR Corporation	2002 – present
1,432 mm (4 ft 8 3/8 in)	Disneyland Resort line	3.8	MTR Corporation	2005 – present
1,435 mm (4 ft 8 1/2 in)	East Rail line	41.5	MTR Corporation	1910 – present
1,435 mm (4 ft 8 1/2 in)	Light Rail	36.2	MTR Corporation	1988 – present
1,435 mm (4 ft 8 1/2 in)	Tuen Ma line	56.193	MTR Corporation	2003 – present
1,435 mm (4 ft 8 1/2 in)	South Island line	7.4	MTR Corporation	2016 – present
1,435 mm (4 ft 8 1/2 in)	Guangzhou–Shenzhen–Hong Kong Express Rail Link Hong Kong section	26	MTR Corporation	2018 – present
1,520 mm (4 ft 11 27/32 in)	Peak Tram	1.365	The Peninsula Hotels	1888 – present

== Former narrow gauge ==
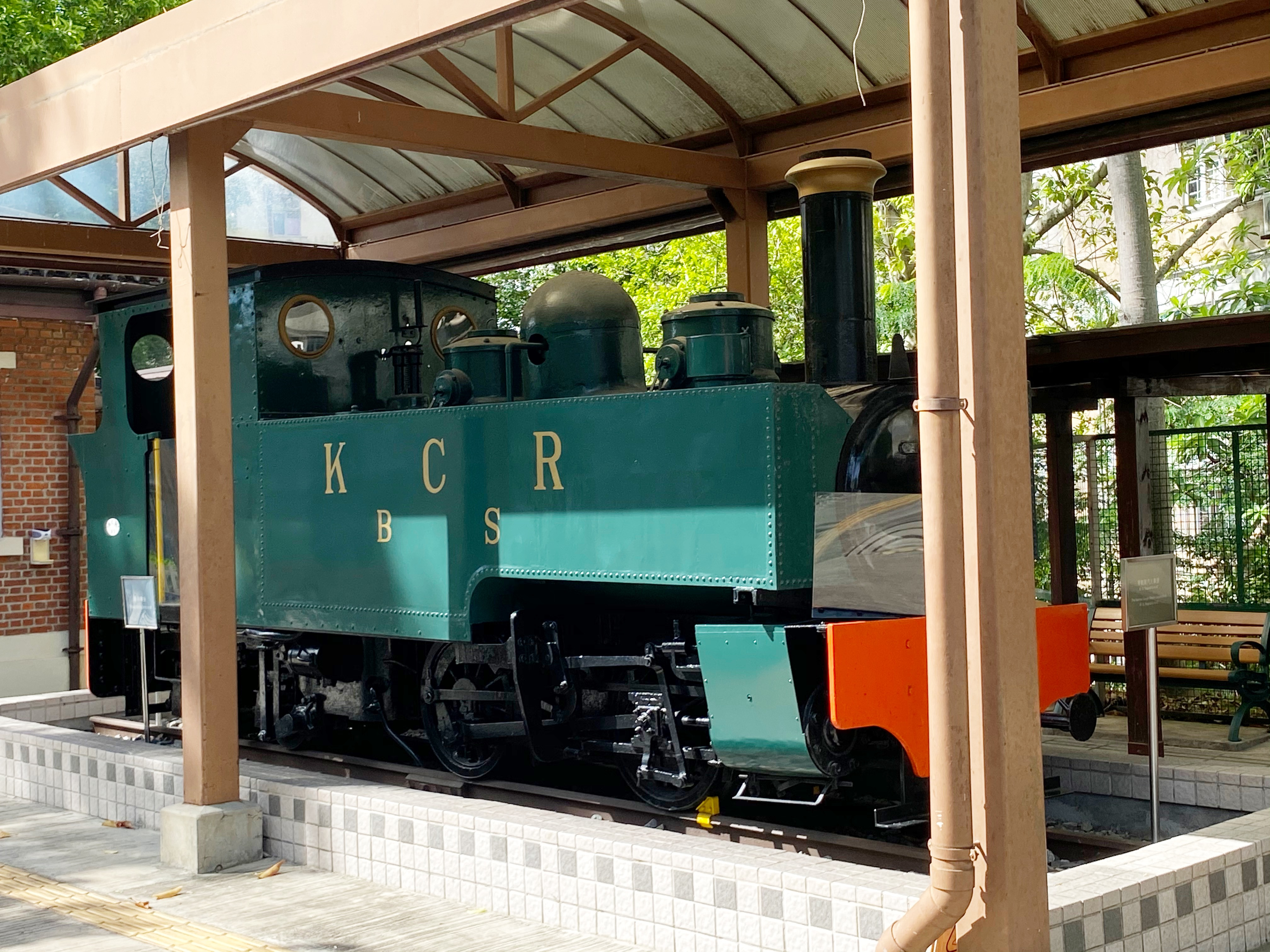
Preserved Kowloon-Canton Railway locomotive

The Kowloon–Canton Railway (now East Rail) was originally partially laid to 2 ft (610 mm) and 3 ft (914 mm) gauge during its construction, and the latter was proposed to be its gauge since the tunnel could only accommodate 3 ft gauge if the line was to be double track throughout. However it was built to standard gauge and was single track, retaining space at places for later expansion. The now-defunct Sha Tau Kok Railway, built in 1911 and closed in 1928, constructed of the same materials used for constructing the main line, was 2 ft gauge. The famous Hong Kong Tramways are 3 ft 6 in (1,067 mm) gauge. The MTR uses a gauge of 1,432 mm (4 ft 8 3/8 in), 3 mm narrower than the standard gauge. Originally it was to be standard gauge but when the link between the KCR and MTR at Kowloon Tong fell into disuse due to the difference in the choice of voltage for their respective electrification plans, the latter favoured a narrower gauge for technical reasons. This has proven to be an impediment of the proposed merger between the two systems.

The haematite mine at Ma On Shan used an electric internal railway network of 2 ft 6 in (762 mm)

The Kowloon Godowns in Tsim Sha Tsui, before redevelopment in the 1970s, also had an extensive network of 2 ft (610 mm) gauge tracks using tiny hand-pushed 2-axle trucks. Similar systems existed elsewhere in Hong Kong. Railways believed to be metre gauge existed in Taikoo Dockyards and Whampoa Dockyards, though standard gauge is more probable for the latter, since it was connected to the main line network after 1937. A cement works in To Kwa Wan, north of the Whampoa dockyards, used a small internal narrow gauge system with jubilee track (prefabricated panels) and wagons, but apart from a few aerial photographs available at the Lands Department Mapping Office, there is little available information about this system.

During the reclamation of Kowloon Bay for the construction of the Kai Tak estates, "jubilee" track and steam locomotives were used to convey spoil. This area became the Kai Tak Airport which has now been demolished.

== See also ==
- Bucharest Metro, which also uses 1,432 mm (4 ft 8 3/8 in) gauge.
