= Severn Lamb =

Manufacturer of various forms of transport systems and equipment

- Type: Private Company
- Industry: Transport systems and equipment
- Founded: 1948
- Founder: Peter Severn Lamb
- Headquarters: Alcester, England, United Kingdom
- Key people: Patrick Lamb (Managing Director)
- Number of employees: 26
- Subsidiaries: Trams International
- Website: severn-lamb.com

SL Transportation Limited, trading as Severn Lamb and sometimes known as Severn-Lamb, is a manufacturer of various forms of transport systems and equipment, principally aimed at the leisure market. They are based at Alcester in the English county of Warwickshire, but sell their products worldwide. As of January 2023, the firm is managed by Severn Lamb's grandson and employs 26 people.

== History ==
The company was founded by Peter Severn Lamb in 1948 in Stratford-upon-Avon. In its early days it predominantly manufactured steam locomotives for model and miniature railways. Today it manufactures diesel hydraulic, LPG, and battery electric locomotives for narrow gauge railways in theme parks and similar venues, together with road trains, monorails and various themed custom vehicles, including electric vehicles, buses, and boats.

Notable customers include Disney, with vehicles built for the Wildlife Express Train at Disney's Animal Kingdom in Walt Disney World Resort, the Disneyland Railroad at Disneyland Paris, and the Hong Kong Disneyland Railroad at Hong Kong Disneyland. Vehicles have also been built for many other theme parks and resorts, including Busch Gardens Tampa in Florida, Mirabilandia in Italy, Kuwait Entertainment City in Kuwait, Genting Highlands in Malaysia, and Thorpe Park and Legoland Windsor in the United Kingdom.

Severn Lamb also built the never-opened Sylvester's McMonkey McBean Unusual Driving Machines at Universal's Islands of Adventure and 52 electrically powered platforms that provided the moving stage that encircled the perimeter of the arena for the opening and closing ceremonies of the 2004 Olympic Games in Athens.

In November 2022, it was announced Severn Lamb had acquired the US and global supplier of trams, Trams International.

== Gallery ==
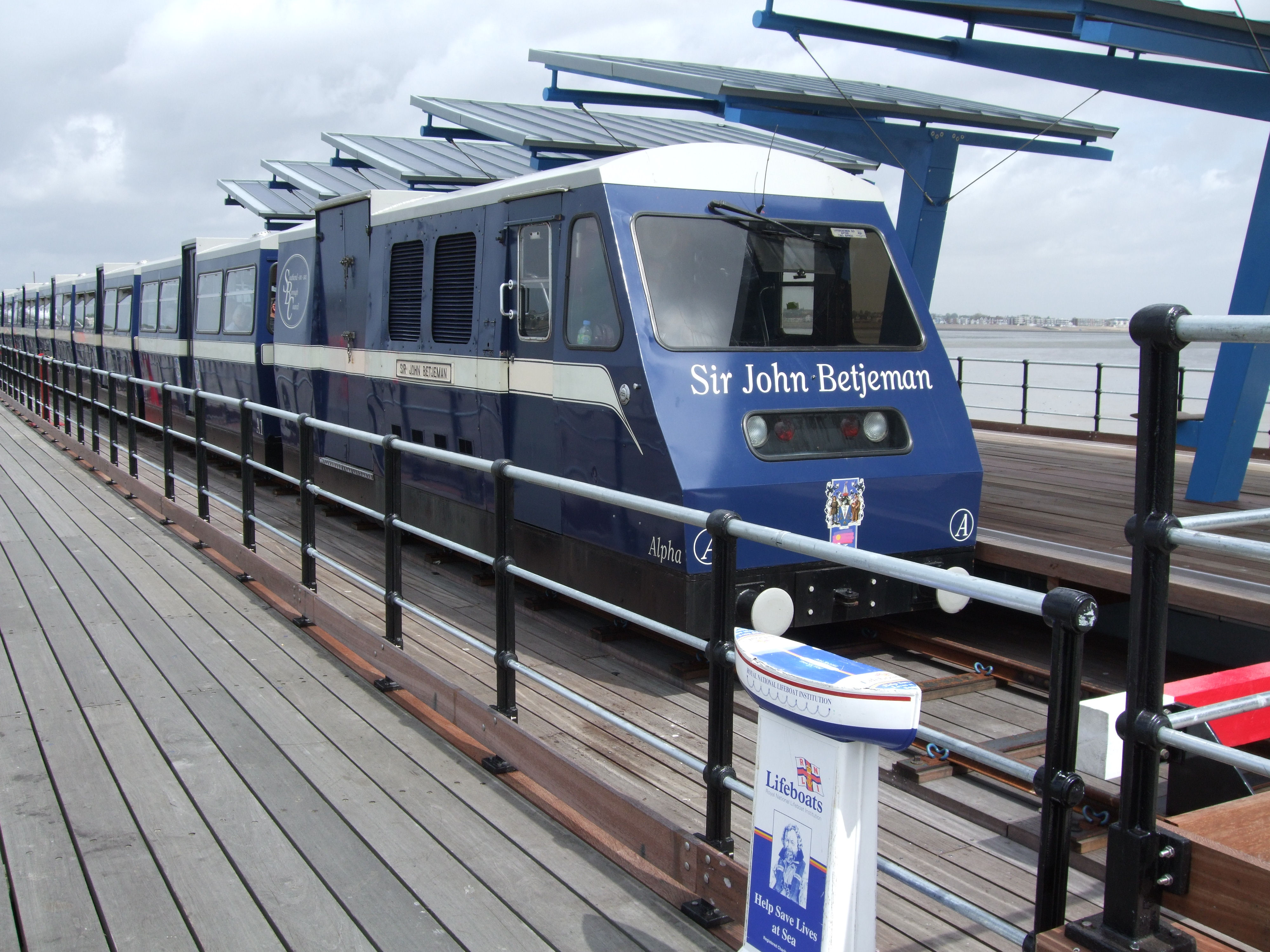
A diesel train built for Southend Pier Railway in 1986, and named after poet John Betjeman.

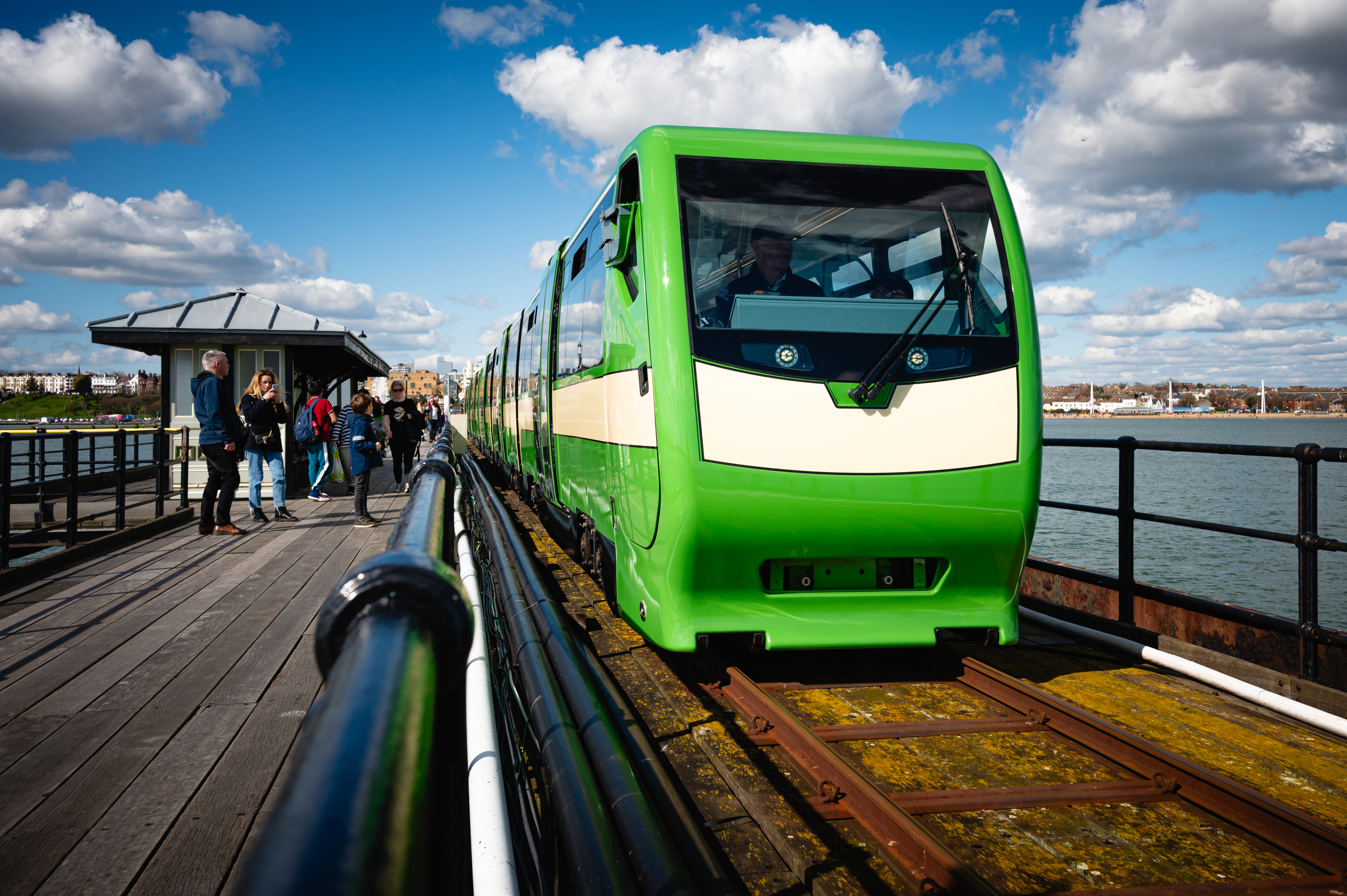
An electric train built for the Southend Pier Railway in 2021.

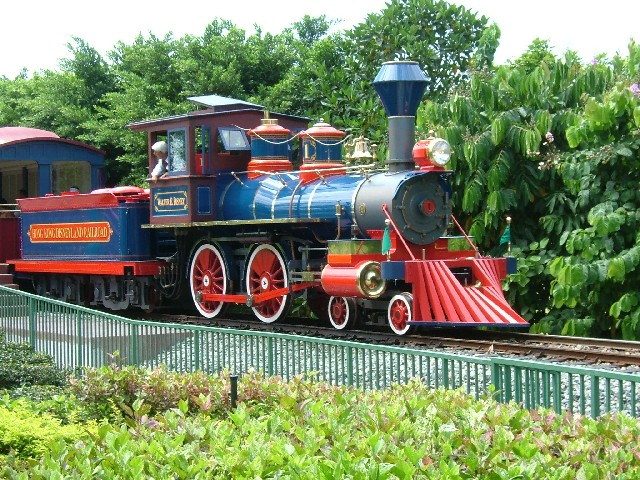
A steam outline diesel locomotive built in 2004 for the Hong Kong Disneyland Railroad at Hong Kong Disneyland.

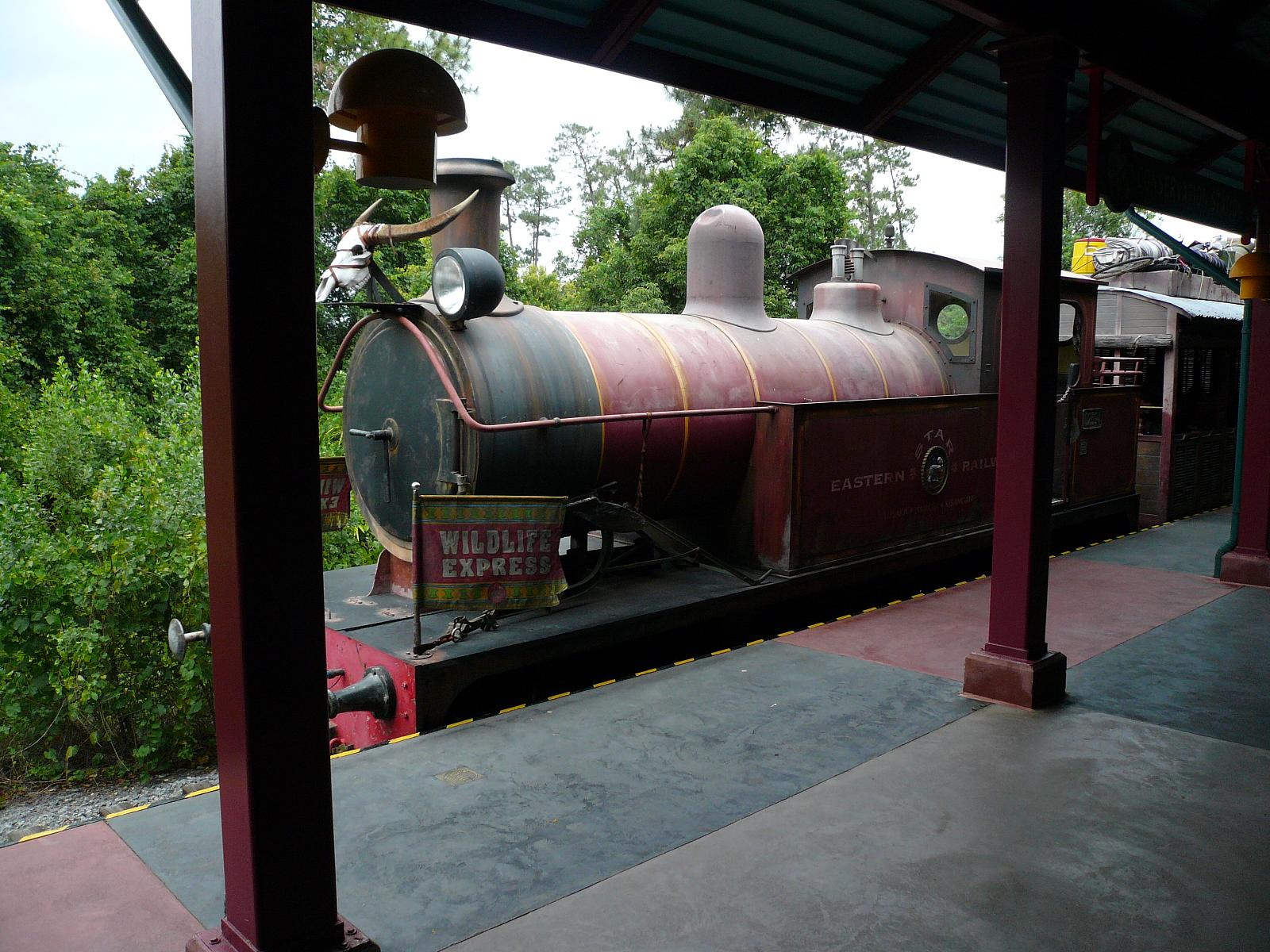
A deliberately distressed steam outline diesel locomotive built in 1997 for the Wildlife Express Train at Disney World.

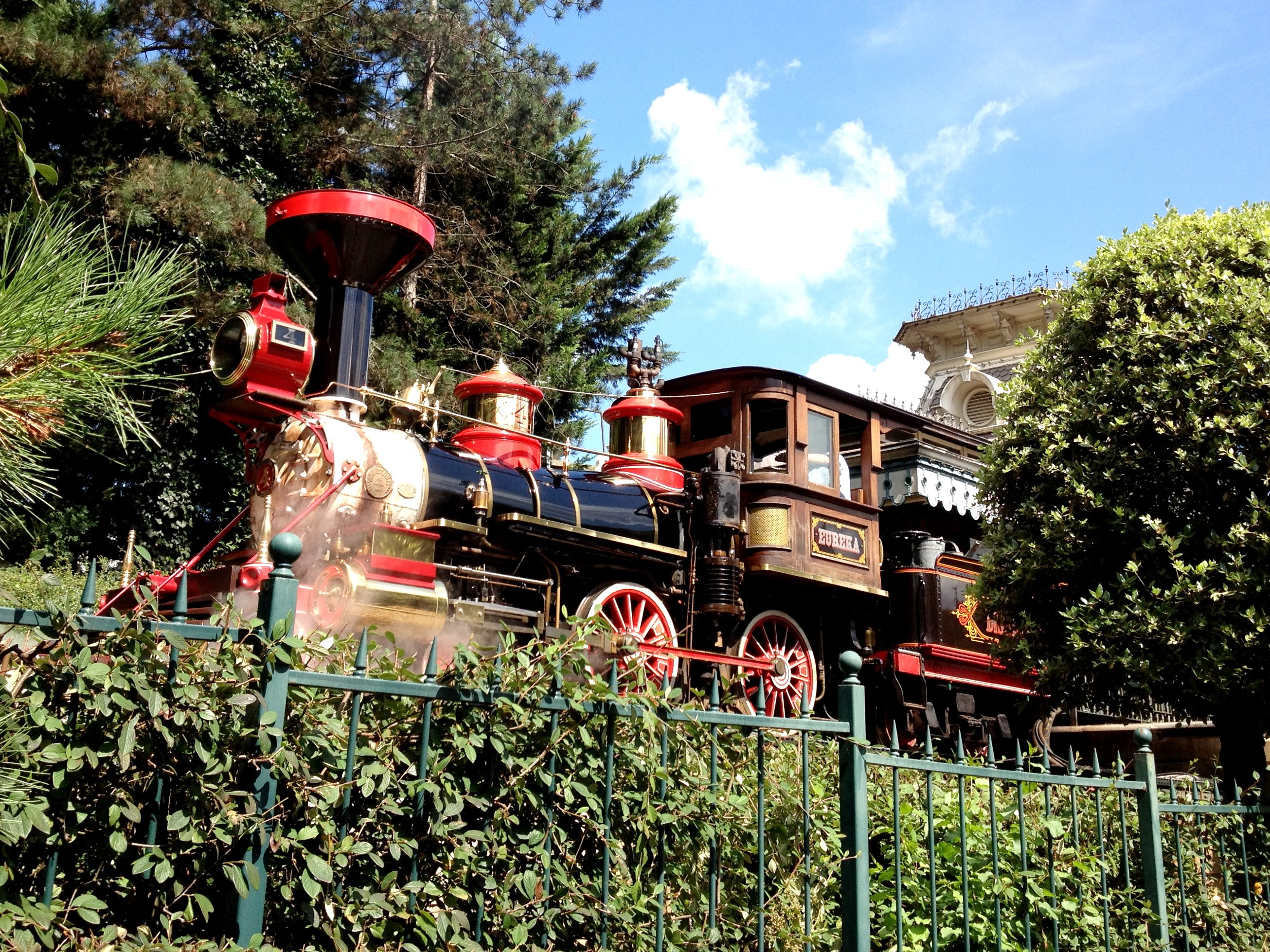
Disneyland Railroad No. 4 Eureka, a live steam locomotive built in 1993 for Disneyland Paris.

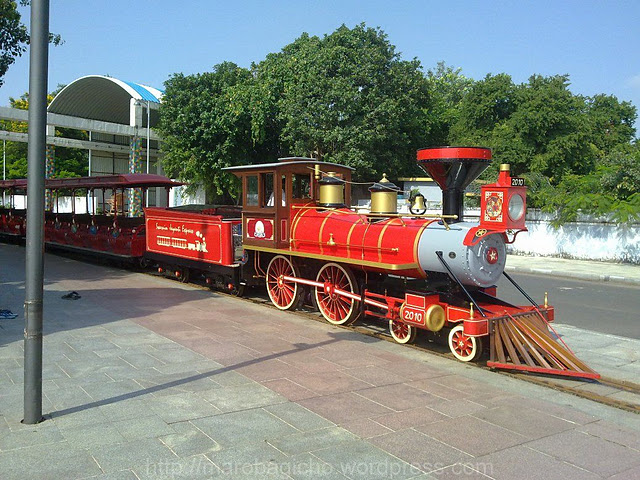
The Atal Express at Kankaria Lake, Ahmedabad, India, named after former Prime Minister Atal Bihari Vajpayee.

== See also ==
- List of locomotive builders
