= Sunny Bay station =

MTR interchange station in the New Territories, Hong Kong

Sunny Bay 欣澳
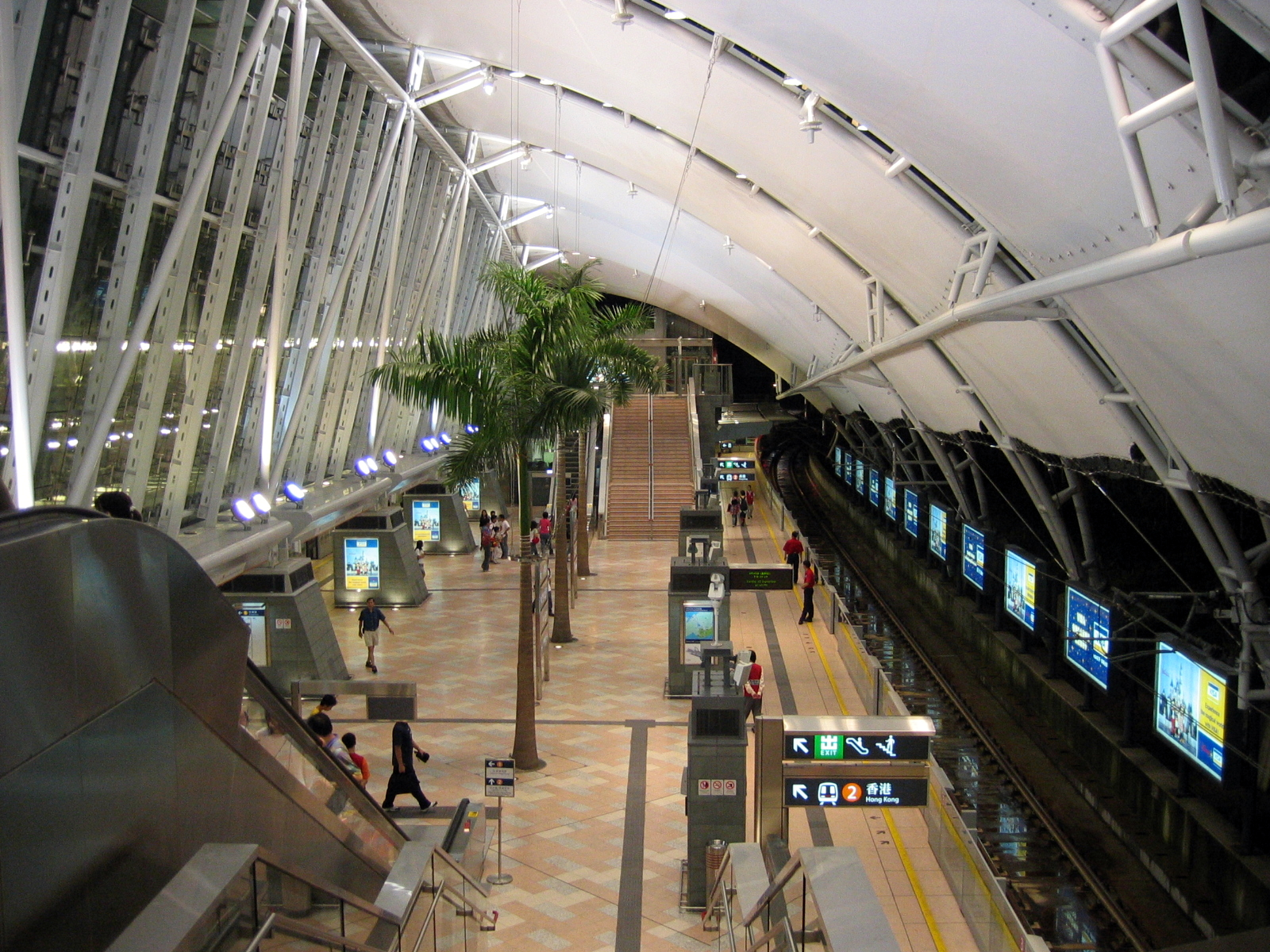
- Disneyland Resort line platform

Chinese name
- Chinese: 欣澳
- Cantonese Yale: Yān ou
- Literal meaning: Joyful Bay
Transcriptions
Standard Mandarin
- Hanyu Pinyin: Xīn'ào
Yue: Cantonese
- Yale Romanization: Yān ou
- Jyutping: Jan^{1} ou^{3}

General information
- Location: Sunny Bay Road, Yam O, Lantau Island; Tsuen Wan District, Hong Kong
- Coordinates: 22°19′54″N 114°01′44″E
- System: MTR rapid transit station
- Owner: MTR Corporation
- Operator: MTR Corporation
- Lines: Tung Chung line; Disneyland Resort line
- Platforms: 3 (1 cross-transfer island platform and 1 side platform)
- Tracks: 5 (2 non-stopping tracks used by the Airport Express)
- Connections: Bus

Construction
- Structure type: At-grade
- Accessible: Yes
- Architect: Aedas

Other information
- Station code: SUN

History
- Opened: Tung Chung line : 1 June 2005; 21 years ago; Disneyland Resort line : 1 August 2005; 21 years ago

Services
Preceding station	MTR	Following station
Tsing Yi towards Hong Kong	Tung Chung line	Tung Chung Terminus
Terminus	Disneyland Resort line	Disneyland Resort Terminus
Airport Express does not stop here
Under construction
Tsing Yi towards Tamar	Tung Chung line	Oyster Bay towards Tung Chung West
Track layout
Location
- Location within MTR

Sunny Bay (Chinese: 欣澳; Jyutping: jan^{1} ou^{3}; Cantonese Yale: Yān ou) is an MTR station in Yam O. It is between Tung Chung and Tsing Yi stations. The station is an interchange station between the Tung Chung line and the Disneyland Resort line to Hong Kong Disneyland. The station was originally to be named Yam O (陰澳); however, the name was ultimately replaced, likely because of its linguistically negative connotations (Note: Cantonese 陰/Yam is more commonly known to English speakers as Mandarin yin, which connotes a negative quality due to its association with darkness. Yam O was likely named for its location being shaded from sunlight by the mountain.). Services to the station commenced on 1 June 2005. The transfer facilities to the Disneyland Resort line opened 2 months later (1 August 2005) that year. The livery of the station is slate grey.

The station was the first MTR station to have automatic platform gates (APG) installed on the edge of its platforms. These gates range from half to three quarters the height of the platform screen doors found in other MTR stations. In line with ground level and above-ground MTR stations, Sunny Bay and Disneyland Resort stations are not air conditioned, and rely on their open architecture to keep the temperature low.

The station is primarily used to travel to Hong Kong Disneyland, with an interchange from the Tung Chung line onto the Disneyland Resort line, but also provides bus transport links to the Hong Kong–Zhuhai–Macau Bridge and Discovery Bay. The Airport Express passes through the centre tracks of the station without stopping. This station is equipped with emergency platforms for the Airport Express.

== History ==
The Tung Chung line began operations on 22 June 1998, shortly followed by the Airport Express two weeks later on 6 July. However, Sunny Bay station was not built at the time.

On 1 June 2005, in order to prepare for the opening of the Hong Kong Disneyland Resort, Sunny Bay station was opened initially for the staff of the resort. Two months later, on 1 August 2005, Disneyland Resort line also opened to the public.

== Station layout ==
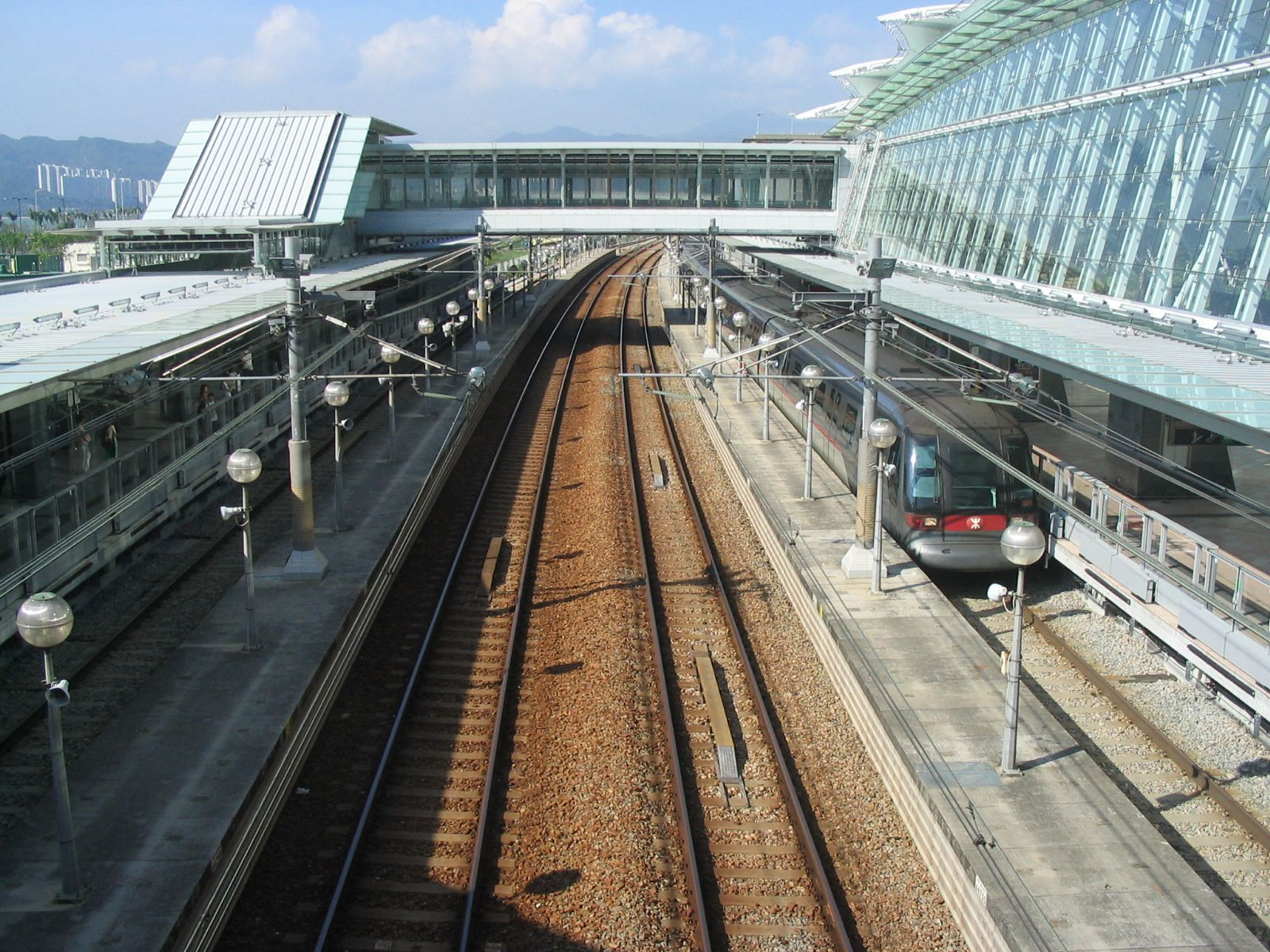
Tung Chung line platforms

Platforms 1 (Tung Chung line towards Tung Chung) and 3 (Disneyland Resort line) are located opposite to each other to allow easy interchange of trains for passengers travelling from the urban areas. Architecture firm Aedas was the architect for the Disneyland Resort line and the architect for the Sunny Bay and Disneyland Resort stations.

Passengers travelling from Hong Kong can disembark and board Disneyland Resort trains departing from the opposite platform. Passengers returning from Disneyland Resort must cross a footbridge to reach platform 2 to board Tung Chung line trains heading towards Hong Kong. The exit gates are located on the same level and on the same side of the rail tracks as Platform 2.

U1	Footbridge	Footbridge between currently-in-use platforms
G	Concourse	Exit, transport interchange
G	Concourse	Customer services, automatic teller machines
L1; Platforms	Side platform, doors will open on the left
L1; Platforms	Platform 1	Tung Chung line towards Hong Kong (Tsing Yi) →
L1; Platforms	Island platform, not in service, used for emergencies only
L1; Platforms	Airport Express	Airport Express does not stop here →
L1; Platforms	Airport Express	← Airport Express does not stop here
L1; Platforms	Island platform, not in service, used for emergencies only
L1; Platforms	Platform 2	← Tung Chung line towards Tung Chung (Terminus)
L1; Platforms	Island platform, doors will open on the left for Tung Chung line, right for Disneyland Resort line
L1; Platforms	Platform 3	Disneyland Resort line towards Disneyland Resort (Terminus) →

== Entrance/exit ==
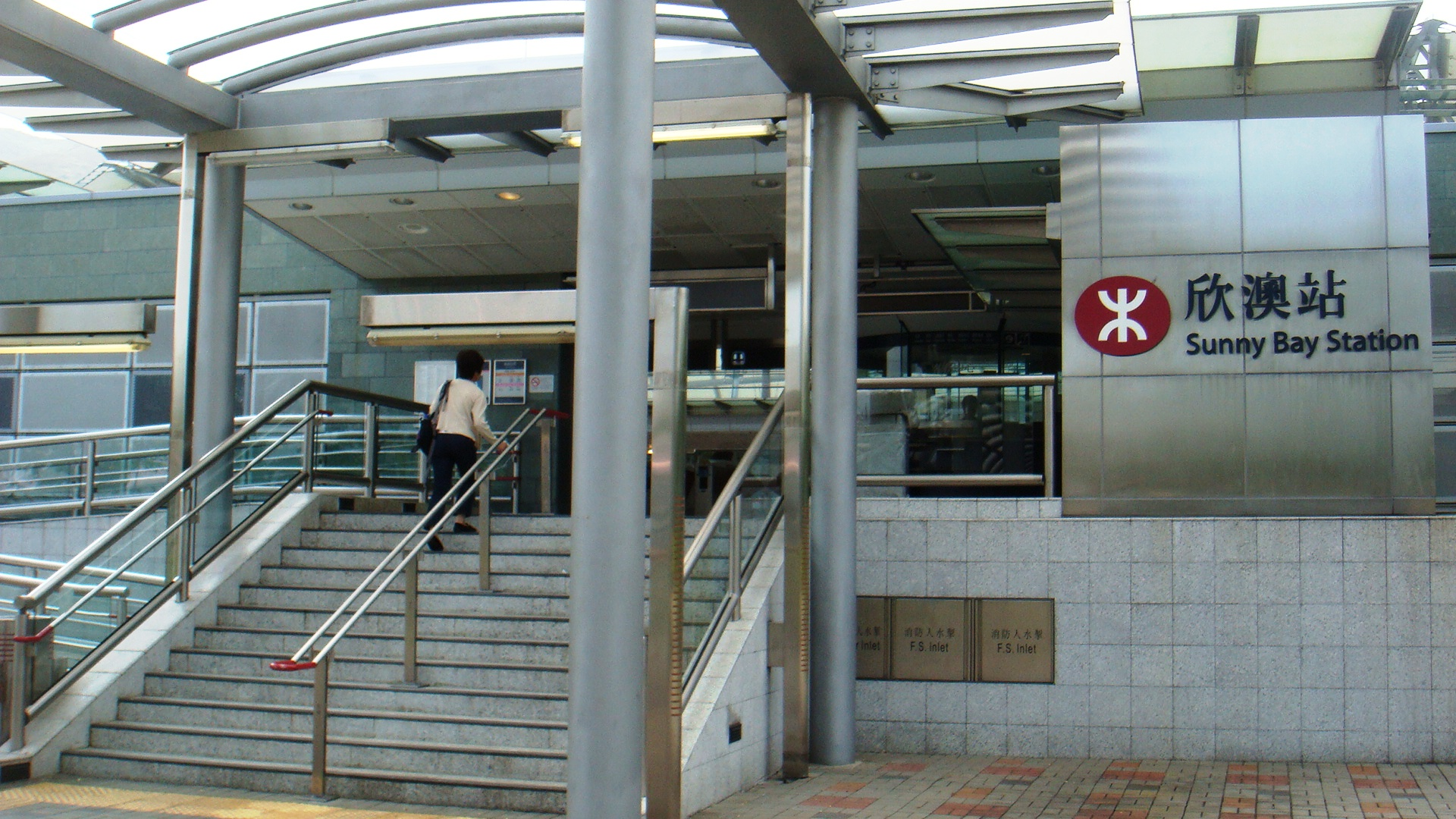
The exit at Sunny Bay

- A: Transport interchange

Situated in reclaimed land near Yam O, the area is uninhabited and the sole exit leads to an emergency car park and transport interchange. As of 2005, the interchange is solely used by residents of Discovery Bay as the only bus routes run from the interchange to Discovery Bay, and as of late 2018, local passengers use this station in order to change for border route B5 (operated by Citybus) in order to change for buses to Macau and Zhuhai.

== See also ==
- Rail transport in Walt Disney Parks and Resorts
