= Hong Kong Disneyland Railroad =

Rail transport attraction at Hong Kong Disneyland

Coordinates: 22.313116°N 114.044027°E

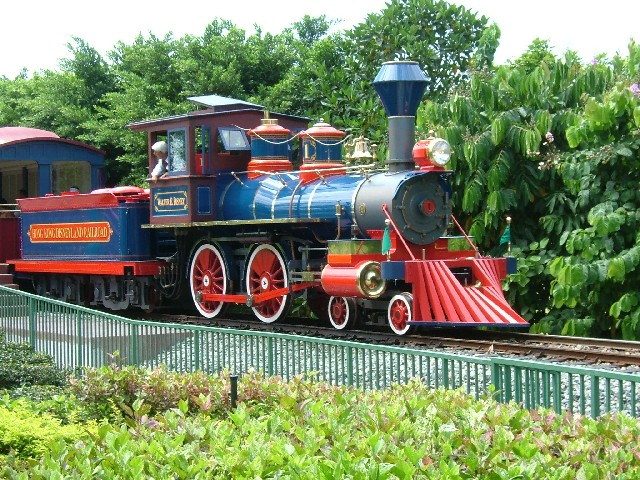
- HKDRR locomotive no. 1 Walter E. Disney awaiting departure at Fantasyland Station.

Hong Kong Disneyland
- Status: Operating
- Opening date: September 12, 2005

Ride statistics
- Attraction type: Heritage railway
- Manufacturer: Severn Lamb
- Designer: Walt Disney Imagineering
- Length: 5,000 ft (1,500 m)
- Vehicle type: Train
- Vehicles: 3 steam-outline locomotives; 10 passenger cars
- Riders per vehicle: 250 per train
- Duration: 20 minutes
- No. of tracks: Single
- Track gauge: 3 ft (914 mm)
- Sponsor: UPS (2005–present)

The Hong Kong Disneyland Railroad is a 3 ft (914 mm) narrow gauge rail transport attraction in Hong Kong Disneyland, which opened on September 12, 2005, the same day the park opened. Its route is 5,000 feet (1,524 m) long and encircles the majority of the park with stations in the Main Street, U.S.A. and Fantasyland sections.

== Ride experience ==
Traveling in a clockwise direction, the train departs Main Street Station and travels through Adventureland, where passengers are able to see Grizzly Gulch and the rivers of the Jungle River Cruise. Parts of Mystic Point and Toy Story Land can also be seen. After passing through Adventureland, the train arrives in Fantasyland and makes a stop at Fantasyland Station. Passengers who wish to visit this land may disembark at this station.

After dropping off and picking up passengers, the train then departs Fantasyland Station, traveling over the passageway to the World of Frozen. Passengers are also able to see the Fantasy Gardens, Mad Hatter Tea Cups, and the walkway to It's a Small World. The train also travels underneath the queue line of the Storybook Theater, currently home to the stage show Mickey and the Wondrous Book.

The train then leaves Fantasyland and passes through Tomorrowland, where passengers can see Space Mountain (currently themed as Hyperspace Mountain) and other attractions in the area. It also passes through the showbuilding of Ant-Man and The Wasp: Nano Battle!, Iron Man Experience and the Avengers Attraction, both part of Stark Expo. After passing through Tomorrowland, the train finally arrives back at Main Street Station, completing the journey around the park.

Hong Kong Disneyland Railroad stations

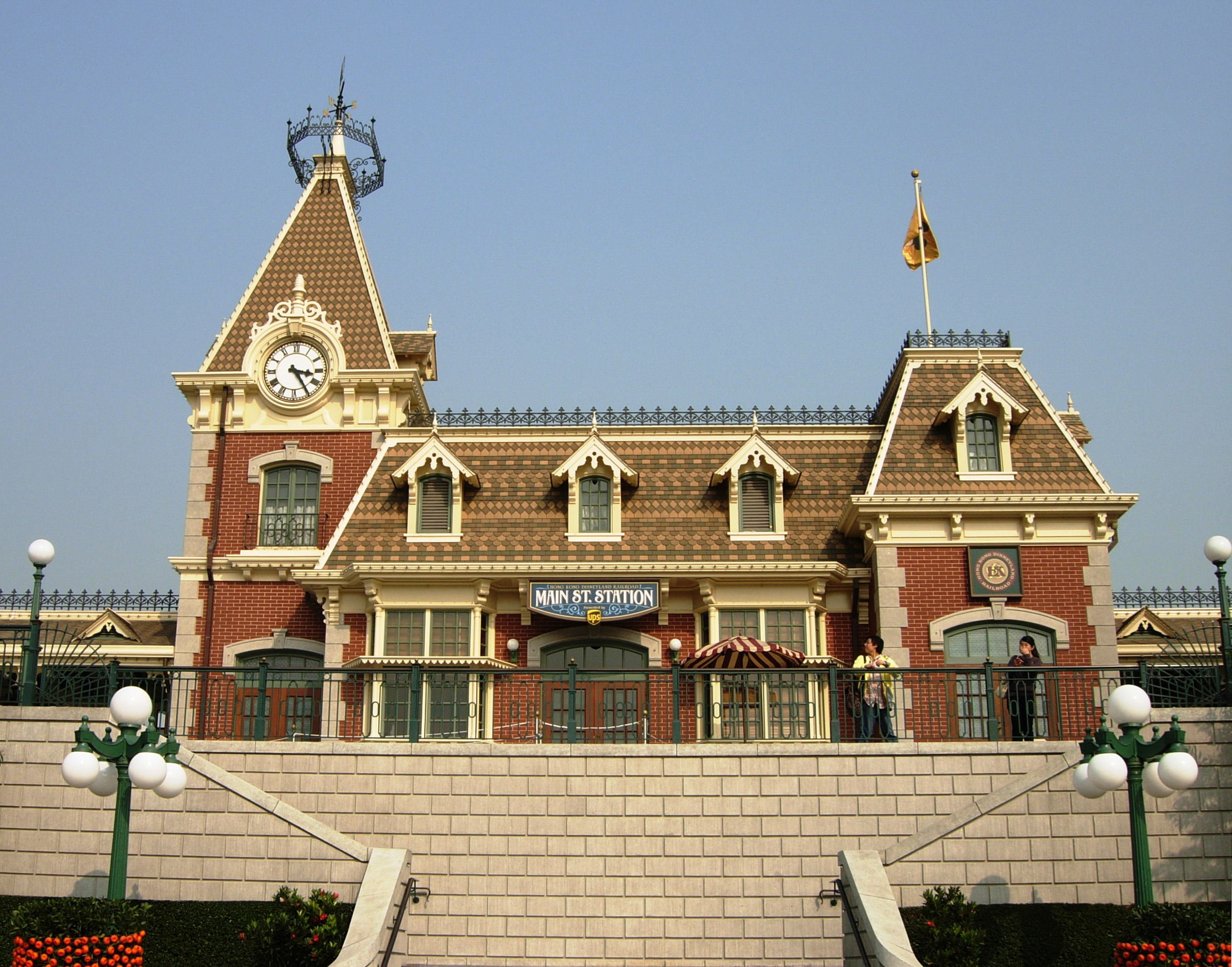
Main Street station

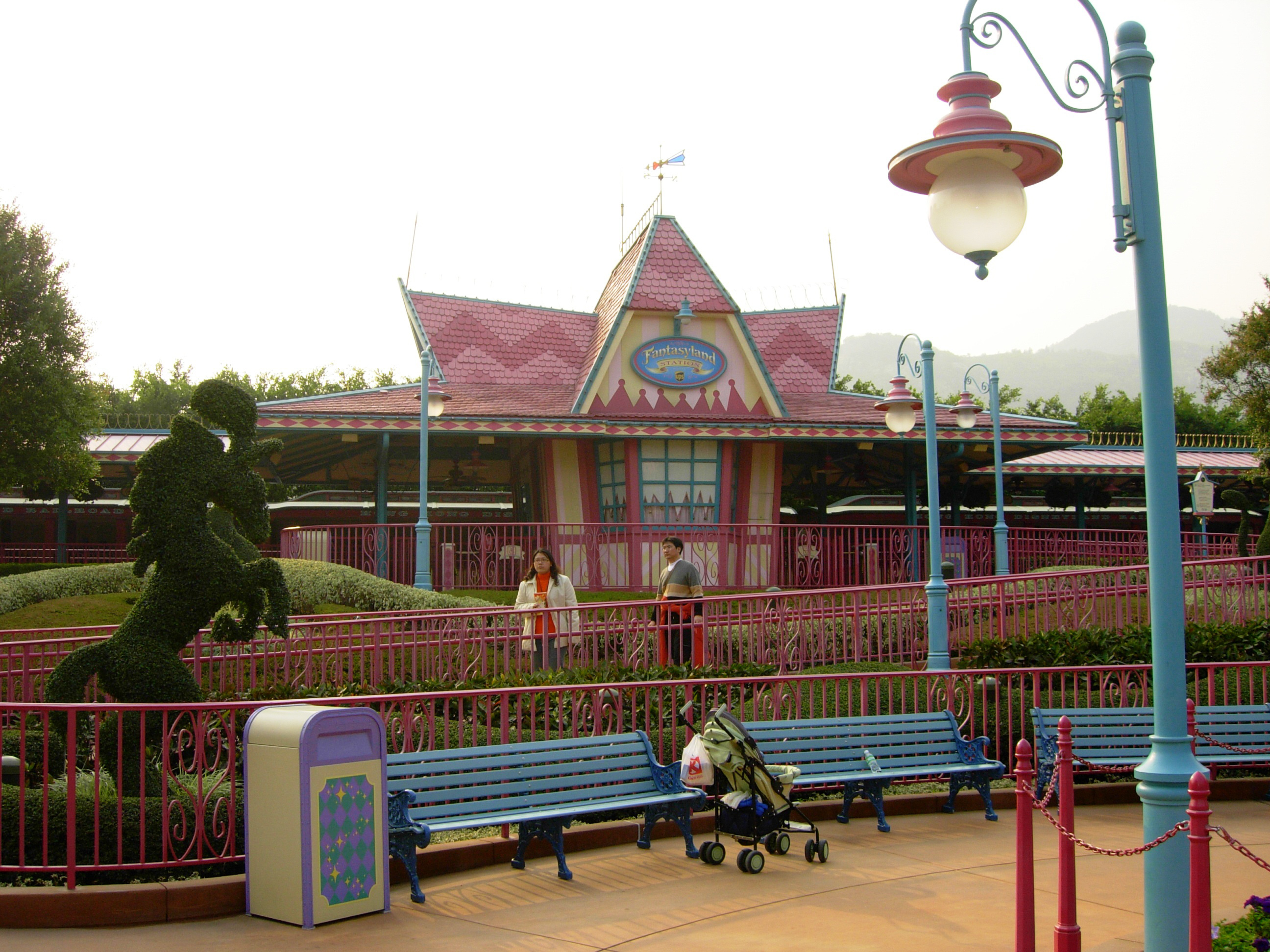
Fantasyland station

During peak traffic periods, the railroad offers only one-way trips where all passengers must disembark at the Fantasyland Station and re-board for the return trip to Main Street, U.S.A. (and vice versa). Between February 19, 2019 and November 17, 2023, the Hong Kong Disneyland Railroad was closed to facilitate the construction of World of Frozen. Since June 11, 2025, the Hong Kong Disneyland Railroad is closed again due to the construction of the Marvel inspired Tower of Terror and Mission: Breakout! in Tomorrowland.

== Rolling stock ==
The Hong Kong Disneyland Railroad operates three 4-4-0DH steam-outline locomotives built in 2004 by Severn Lamb, which were named after past Walt Disney Company presidents. There are also two sets of train cars, each consisting of five coaches with a total seating capacity of 250 people on contoured benches facing sideways per train.

Unlike other railroads at Disneyland-style parks, where the trains are powered by actual steam locomotives, Hong Kong Disneyland's trains are powered by steam-outline locomotives, which are diesel locomotives with the outward appearance of steam locomotives. This is due to Hong Kong's strict emissions standards, which also served as a cost-effective measure that obviated the need to build new steam locomotives, or the finding and transport to Hong Kong of suitable existing narrow gauge steam locomotives. As a result, in order to mimic the sound of an actual steam locomotive, typical steam audio (chuffing, steam whistle, etc.) are emitted from speakers installed on each locomotive. Despite the fact that they are not steam-powered, Dana Amendola, the author of All Aboard: The Wonderful World of Disney Trains, describes the locomotives as "a representation of the golden age of railroading."

Hong Kong Disneyland Railroad rolling stock details
Number and name	Namesake	Image	Wheel arrangement	Date built	Builder	Date entered service	Status	Notes
1 Walter E. Disney	Walt Disney	1: Walter E. Disney. Named after Walt Disney, president from 1923 to 1966	4-4-0DH (American)	2004	Severn Lamb	12 Sep 2005	Operational	Named after Walt Disney, president from 1923 to 1966.
2 Roy O. Disney	Roy O. Disney	2: Roy O. Disney. Named after Roy O. Disney, president from 1966 to 1971.	4-4-0DH (American)	2004	Severn Lamb	12 Sep 2005	Operational	Named after Roy O. Disney, president from 1966 to 1971.
3 Frank G. Wells	Frank Wells	3: Frank G. Wells. Named after Frank Wells, president from 1984 to 1994.	4-4-0DH (American)	2004	Severn Lamb	12 Sep 2005	Operational	Named after Frank Wells, president from 1984 to 1994.

== See also ==
- Rail transport in Walt Disney Parks and Resorts
- Track gauge in Hong Kong

== Bibliography ==
- Amendola, Dana (2015), All Aboard: The Wonderful World of Disney Trains (1st ed.), Disney Editions, ISBN 978-1-4231-1714-8
