= Disneyland Resort station =

MTR station in the New Territories, Hong Kong

Disneyland Resort 迪士尼
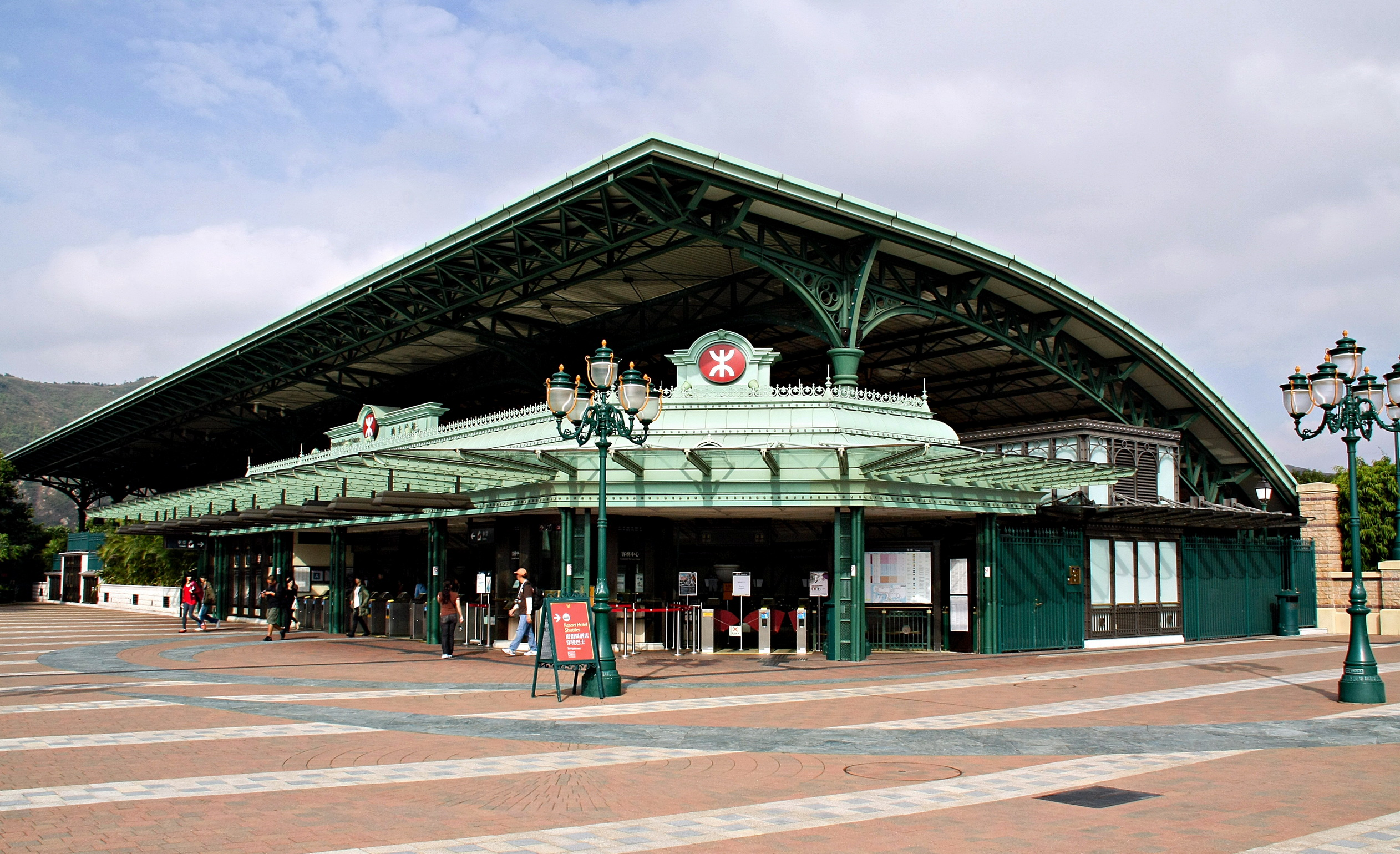
- Station exterior

Chinese name
- Chinese: 迪士尼
- Literal meaning: Disney
Transcriptions
Standard Mandarin
- Hanyu Pinyin: Díshìní
Yue: Cantonese
- Yale Romanization: dik6 si6 nei4
- Jyutping: dik6 si6 nei4

General information
- Location: Fantasy Road, Penny's Bay, Lantau Island; Tsuen Wan District, Hong Kong
- Coordinates: 22°18′56″N 114°02′42″E
- System: MTR rapid transit station
- Operator: MTR Corporation
- Line: Disneyland Resort line
- Platforms: 1 (1 side platform)
- Tracks: 1
- Connections: Bus

Construction
- Structure type: Sub-surface
- Platform levels: 1
- Accessible: Yes
- Architect: Aedas

Other information
- Station code: DIS

History
- Opened: 1 August 2005; 21 years ago
- Former names: Penny’s Bay

Services
Preceding station	MTR	Following station
Sunny Bay Terminus	Disneyland Resort line	Terminus
Track layout
Location
- Location within MTR

Disneyland Resort (Chinese: 迪士尼) is a station on the Hong Kong MTR Disneyland Resort line. It was built to serve the Hong Kong Disneyland Resort and Theme Park, and is located in Penny's Bay.

== History ==
The station opened for public use on 1 August 2005, in preparation for the opening of Hong Kong Disneyland Resort and Theme Park, which opened on 12 September that year.

== Station features ==
The station is designed in a Victorian style, with spacious open areas. It has also been designed with a Disney theme in mind to match the décor of the park. Architecture firm Aedas was the architect for the Disneyland Resort line and, consequently, for the Sunny Bay and Disneyland Resort stations.

This station is the second to have only one platform, after Po Lam station on the Tseung Kwan O line. The platform is equipped with automatic platform gates and was the first of its kind to be introduced in Hong Kong. As of 2015, the current automatic platform gates are as long as a four-car train and can be extended in the future to accommodate a train length of up to eight cars. There is only one exit at this station.

There is a bus interchange at Hong Kong Disneyland Resort and Theme Park. R8 parallels the Disneyland Resort line. Routes R33 and R42 operate only on Sundays and public holidays.

== Gallery ==
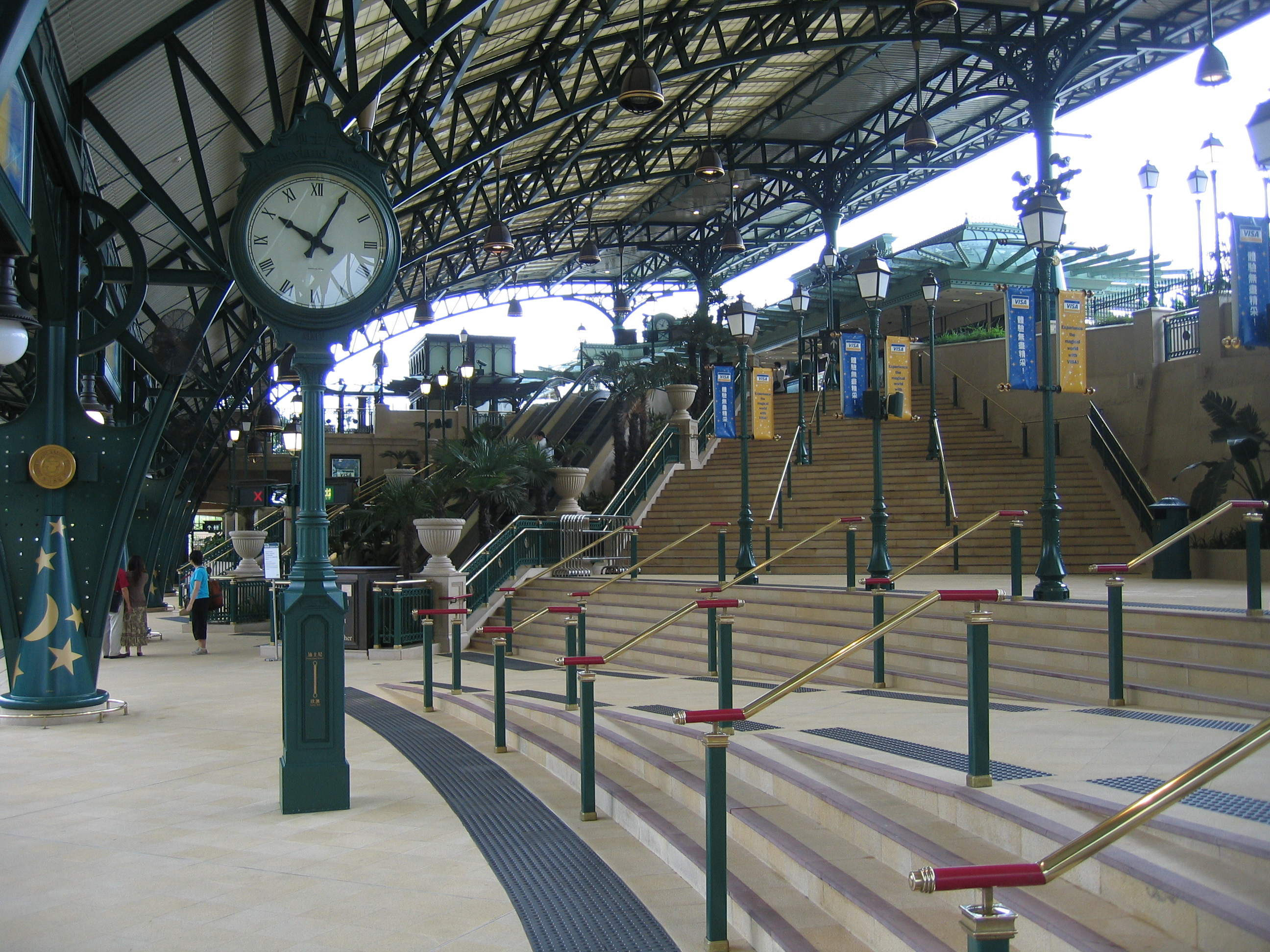
Main lobby

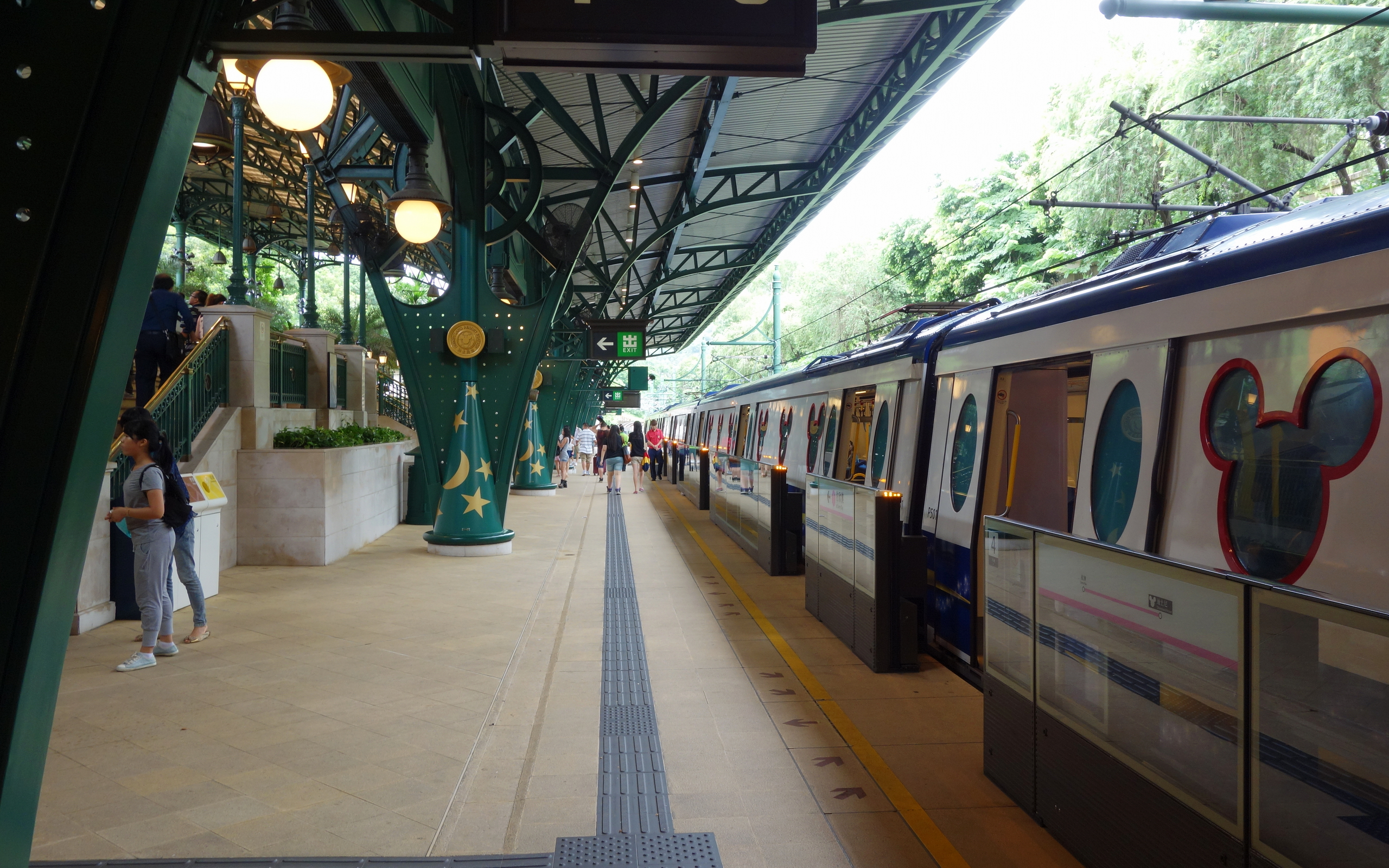
Platform view

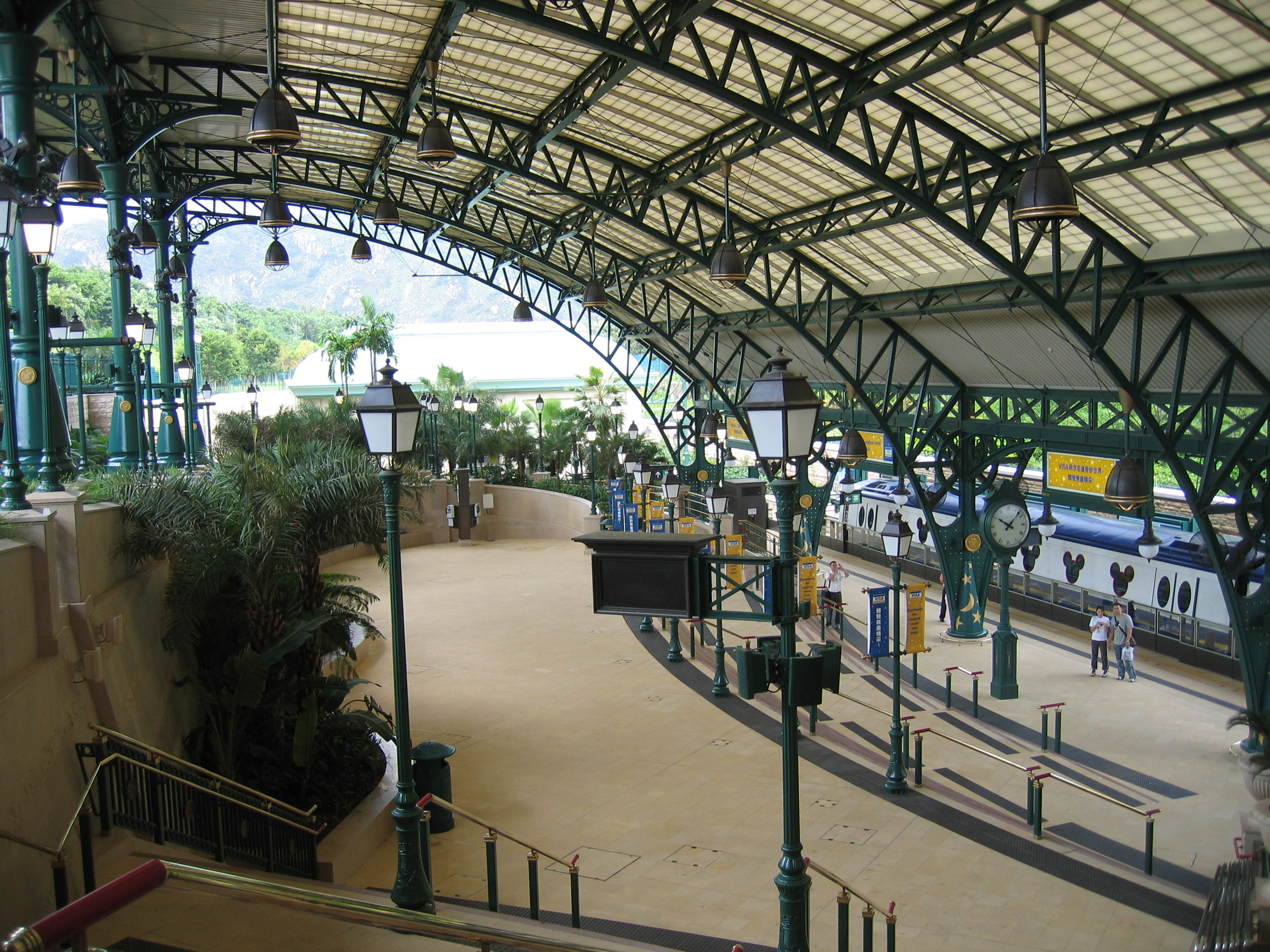
View of the lobby and platform

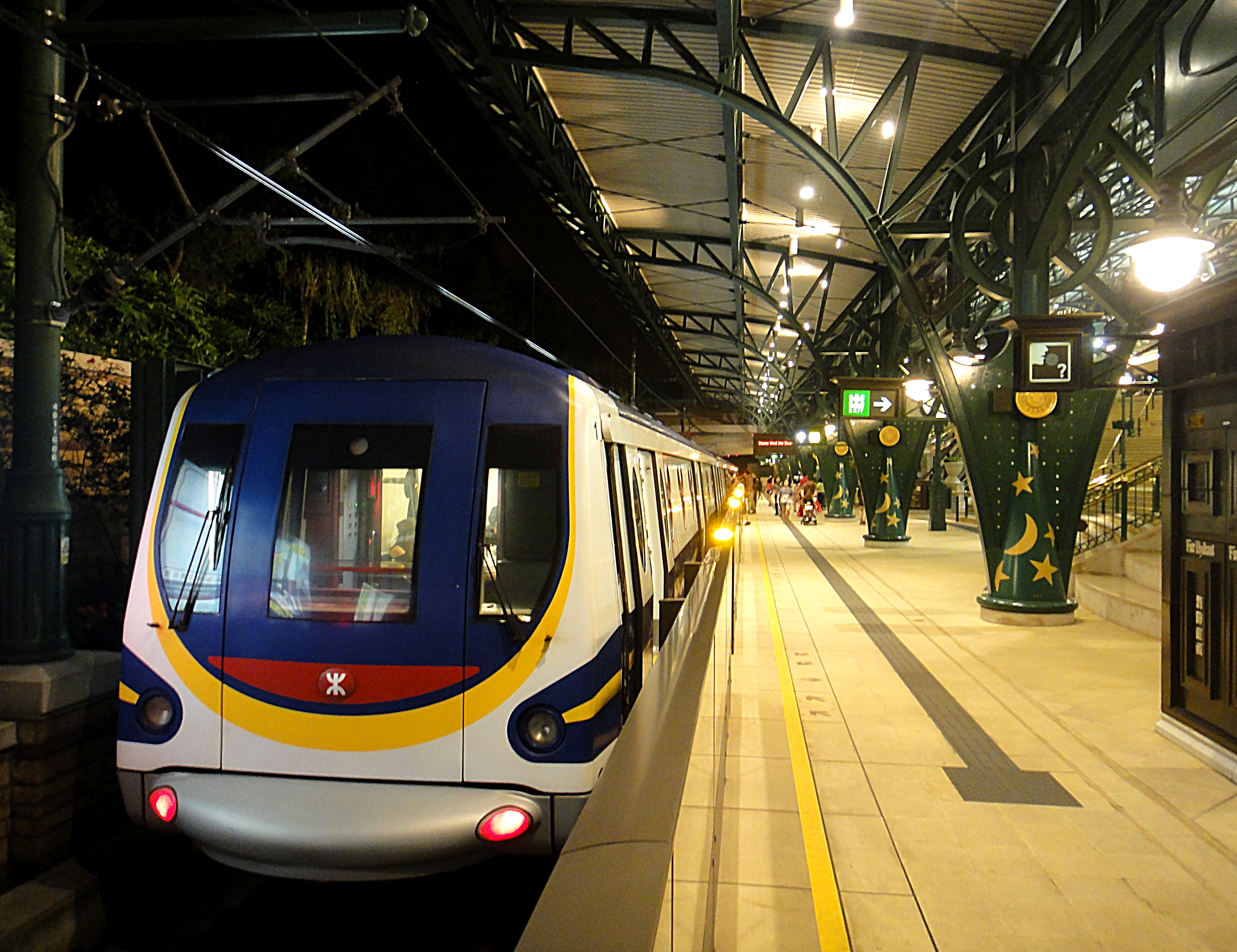
A train awaits departure at night

== Station layout ==
G	Concourse	Exit A, transport interchange/Disneyland HK
G	Concourse	Customer services, automatic teller machines
L1	Side platform, doors will open on the right
L1	Platform 1	Disneyland Resort line towards Sunny Bay (Terminus) →

== See also ==
- Rail transport in Walt Disney Parks and Resorts
