= Disneyland Resort line =

Hong Kong MTR railway line

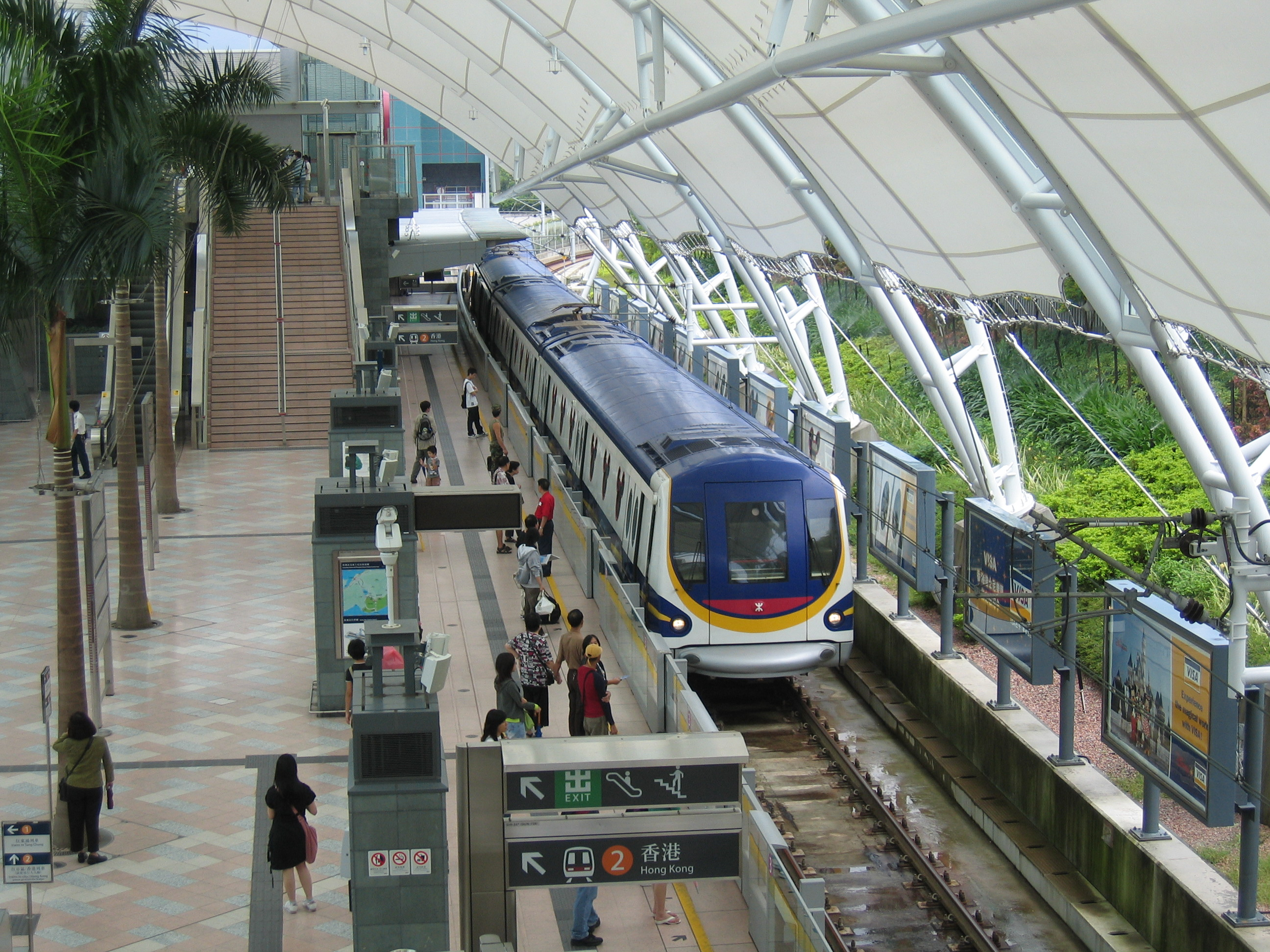
- A Disneyland Resort line train at Sunny Bay station

Overview
- Native name: 迪士尼綫
- Status: Operational
- Owner: MTR Corporation
- Locale: Districts: Tsuen Wan
- Termini: Disneyland Resort; Sunny Bay
- Connecting lines: Tung Chung line
- Stations: 2
- Color on map: Pink (#F173AC)

Service
- Type: Rapid transit, driverless
- System: MTR
- Depot: Siu Ho Wan
- Rolling stock: 3 refurbished Metro Cammell EMUs (DC)
- Ridership: 11,000 daily average (2010)

History
- Opened: 1 August 2005

Technical
- Line length: 3.8 km (2.4 mi)
- Number of tracks: 1 (with a single passing loop)
- Character: At-grade
- Track gauge: 1,432 mm (4 ft 8 3/8 in)
- Electrification: Overhead line, 1,500 V DC
- Operating speed: Average: 55 km/h (34 mph); Maximum: 80 km/h (50 mph)
- Signalling: SelTrac LS, GoA4: UTO (since 2005); Traffic Control Technology CBTC (future)
Route map

Disneyland Resort line
- Traditional Chinese: 迪士尼綫
- Simplified Chinese: 迪士尼线
Transcriptions
Standard Mandarin
- Hanyu Pinyin: Díshìní xiàn
Yue: Cantonese
- Yale Romanization: dihk sih nèih sin
- Jyutping: dik6 si6 nei4 sin3

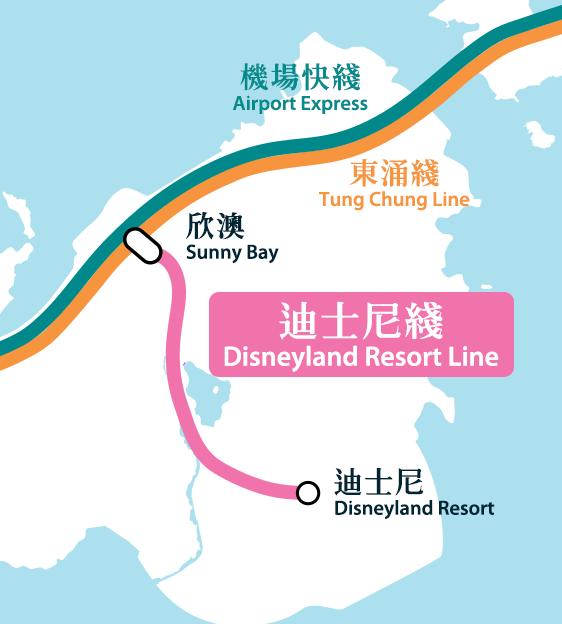
Geographically accurate route map of the Disneyland Resort line

The Disneyland Resort line (Chinese: 迪士尼綫) is a rapid transit line connecting Sunny Bay to the Hong Kong Disneyland Resort, coloured pink on the network diagram. It is the seventh line of the former MTR network before the merger of MTR and KCR. There are only two stations on this line, Sunny Bay and Disneyland Resort, and the line operates as a shuttle service between these two stations. Sunny Bay station is an interchange station with the Tung Chung line between Tsing Yi and Tung Chung stations. Administratively, the entire line is in Tsuen Wan District, despite being situated on Lantau Island, and is the only MTR line in Hong Kong to run within a single district.

== Construction ==
The rail link was constructed by Gammon Construction and completed in April 2005.

In preparation for the opening of Hong Kong Disneyland on 12 September, the line started operating on 1 August 2005. The rolling stock is distinctive on account of its Mickey Mouse windows, interior couch seating, and Disneyland figurines displayed in the carriages.

On 4 September 2005, the Disneyland Resort line served nearly 40,000 passengers. Peak patronage occurs around 08:00–10:00 and 21:00–23:00 hours, at the parks' respective opening and closing times.

== Train design ==
The Disneyland Resort line is 3.5 kilometres (2.2 mi) long, and has a travel time of around 6 minutes from Sunny Bay station to Disneyland Resort station. Its track gauge is 1,432 mm (4 ft 8 3/8 in). The MTR designed a new driverless train and produced it by refitting existing M-Trains for the line which is designed with a Disney theme in mind. Bronze statues of well-known Disney characters, such as Mickey Mouse and Donald Duck, are included inside of the trains, and the windows are shaped like Mickey Mouse's head, instead of the rounded rectangles found on other M-Trains. The windows on the doors are also shaped like ovals instead of rounded rectangles.

All of the trains used on the Disneyland Resort line were originally ordered from 1994 to 1998 as subtype H-Stock train (Phase 3 EMU, A/C 270-291, B/C 486-496). MTR contracted Alstom for these trains, but they were made in England, much like the Phase 1 and 2 trains ordered from 1979 to 1989 and made by Metro-Cammell (also in England), which was acquired by GEC-Alsthom (now Alstom) in 1989. Units A/C274 A/C281 A/C284 A/C289 A/C291 and B/C490 are now used on the Disneyland Resort line; they were refurbished in 2005 by United Goninan (now UGL), the same company that modernized the Urban Line trains from 1998 to 2001.

These trains are the first on the MTR to use automatic train operation during normal operation, followed by the CNR Changchun EMUs in service on the South Island line. However, unlike the South Island line, the operator's cab area has been retained, visible through glass windows at each end of the train.

In 2028, the Disneyland Resort Line is expected to be retrofitted with MTR CRRC Qingdao Sifang EMU trains.

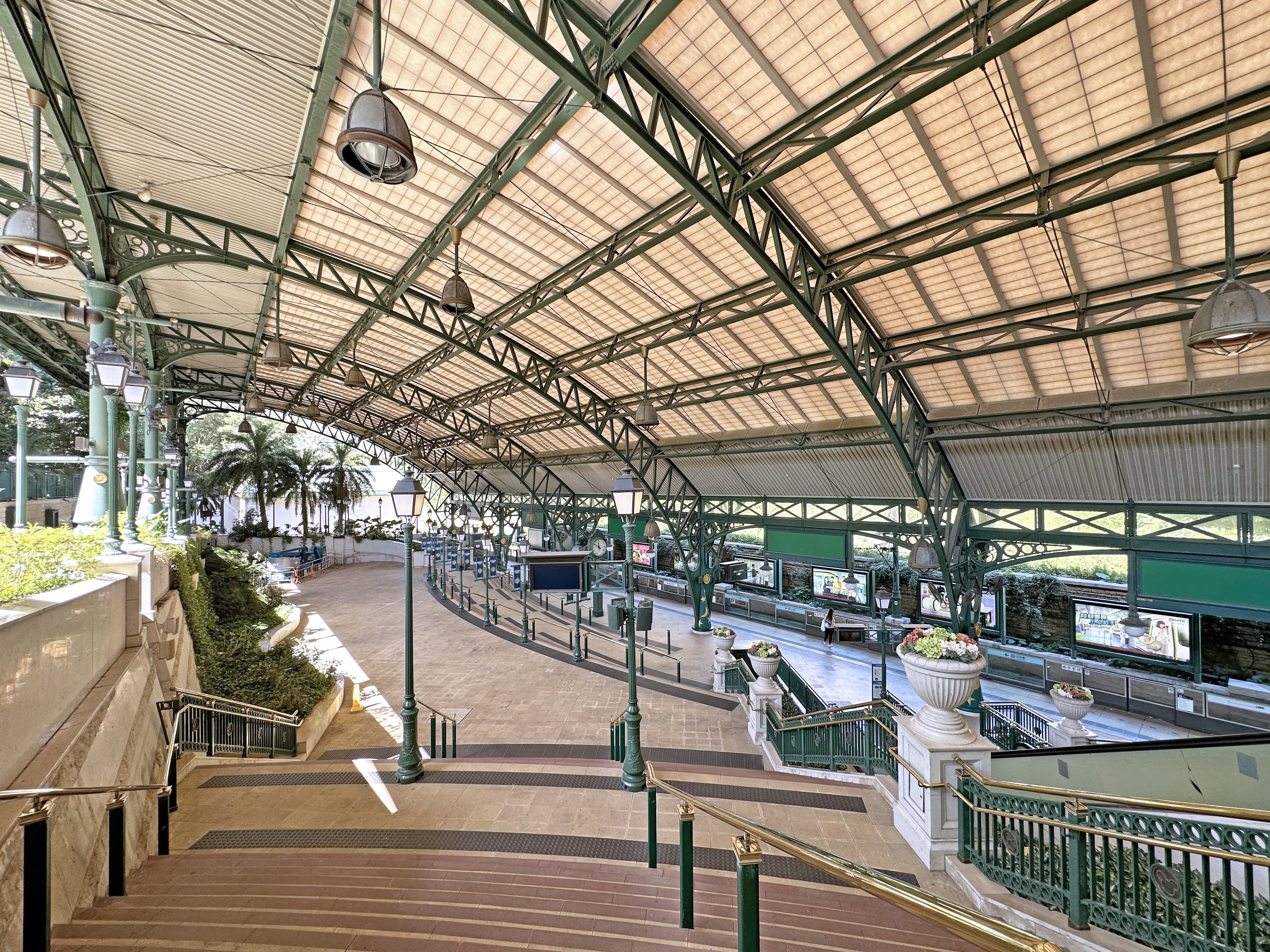
The platforms of the Disneyland Resort station show conspicuous Victorian features.

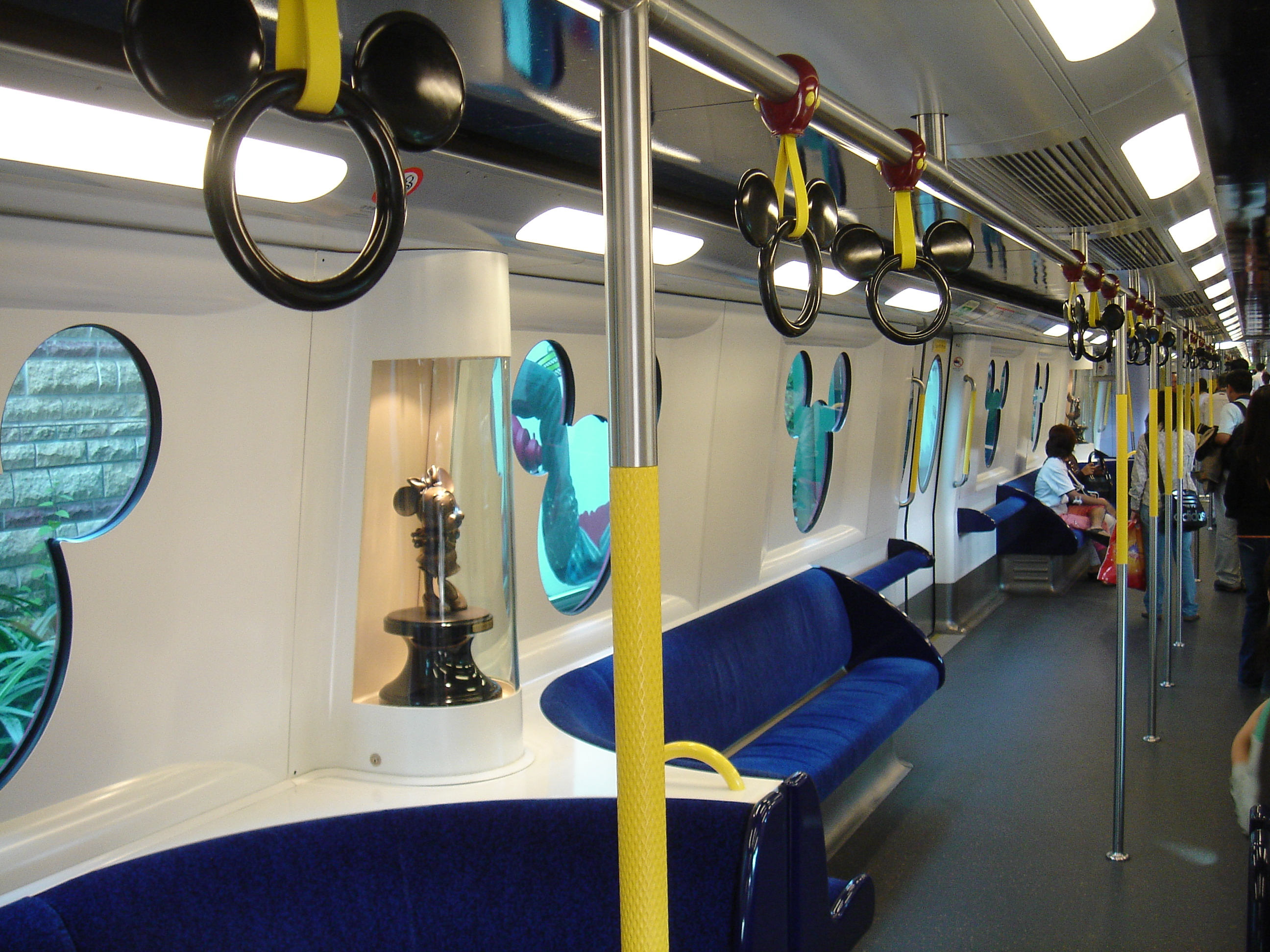
Inside the Disneyland Resort line MTR M-trains. The grab handles resemble Mickey Mouse.

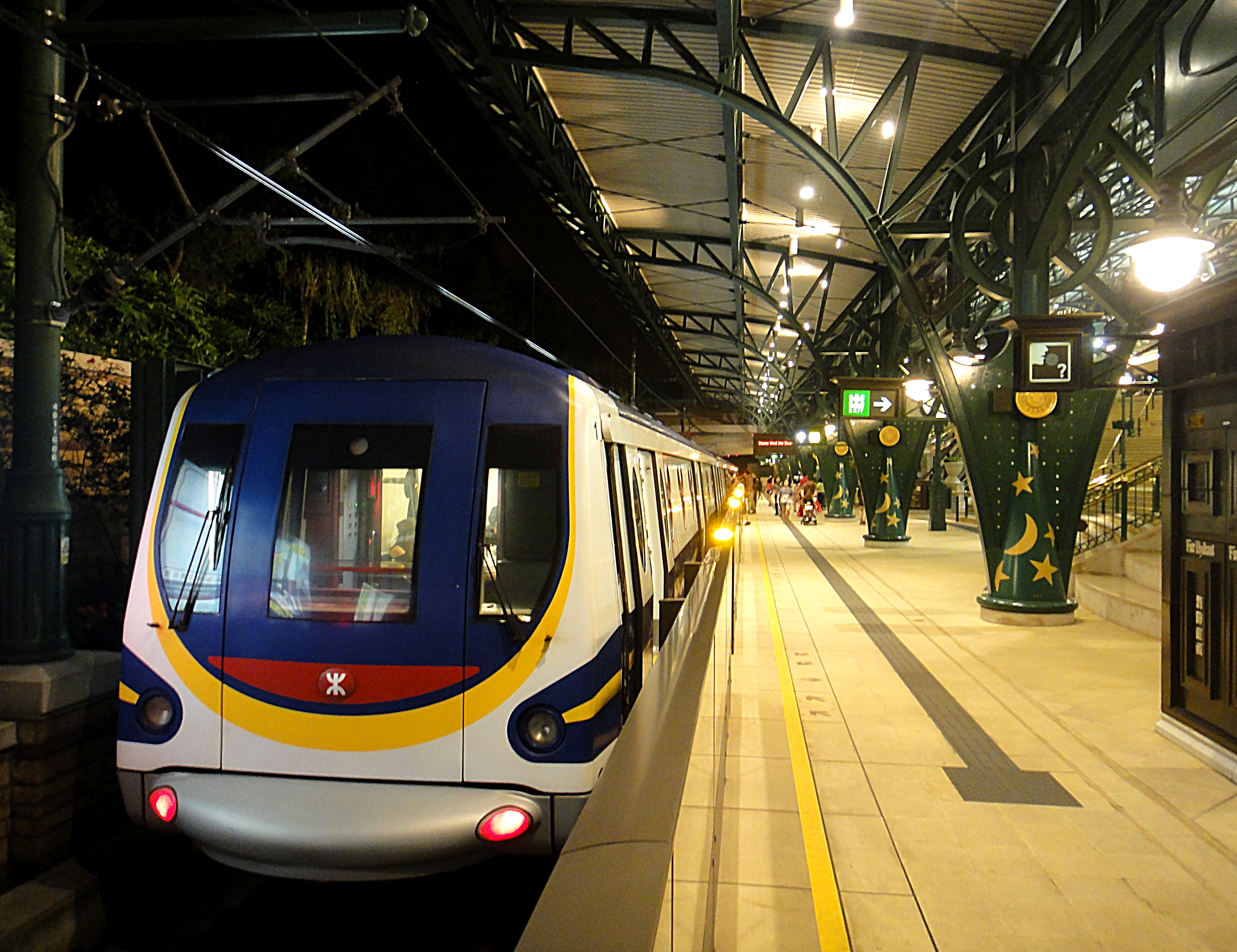
M-Train at Disneyland Resort station

== Stations ==
This is a list of the stations on the Disneyland Resort line.

List

Livery	Station Name		Images	Interchange; Adjacent transportation	Opening	District
Livery	English	Chinese	Images	Interchange; Adjacent transportation	Opening	District
Disneyland Resort Line (DRL)
	Sunny Bay	欣澳		Tung Chung line	1 June 2005; 21 years ago	Tsuen Wan
	Disneyland Resort	迪士尼		—	1 August 2005; 21 years ago	Tsuen Wan

Disneyland Resort station was designed in Victorian architecture, while Sunny Bay was designed to be modern. This contrast in design was done to make passengers feel like they are travelling through time between the fantasy world of the Disneyland Resort and the rest of the city.

== See also ==
- Rail transport in Walt Disney Parks and Resorts
