= Douglas Street =

Douglas Street may refer to:

- Douglas Street (Victoria, British Columbia)
- Douglas Street, Hong Kong
- Douglas Lane
- Ak-Sar-Ben Bridge
