= University Hall, University of Hong Kong =

University of Hong Kong residential hall

Coordinates: 22.2634°N 114.1352°E

University Hall
- 大學堂
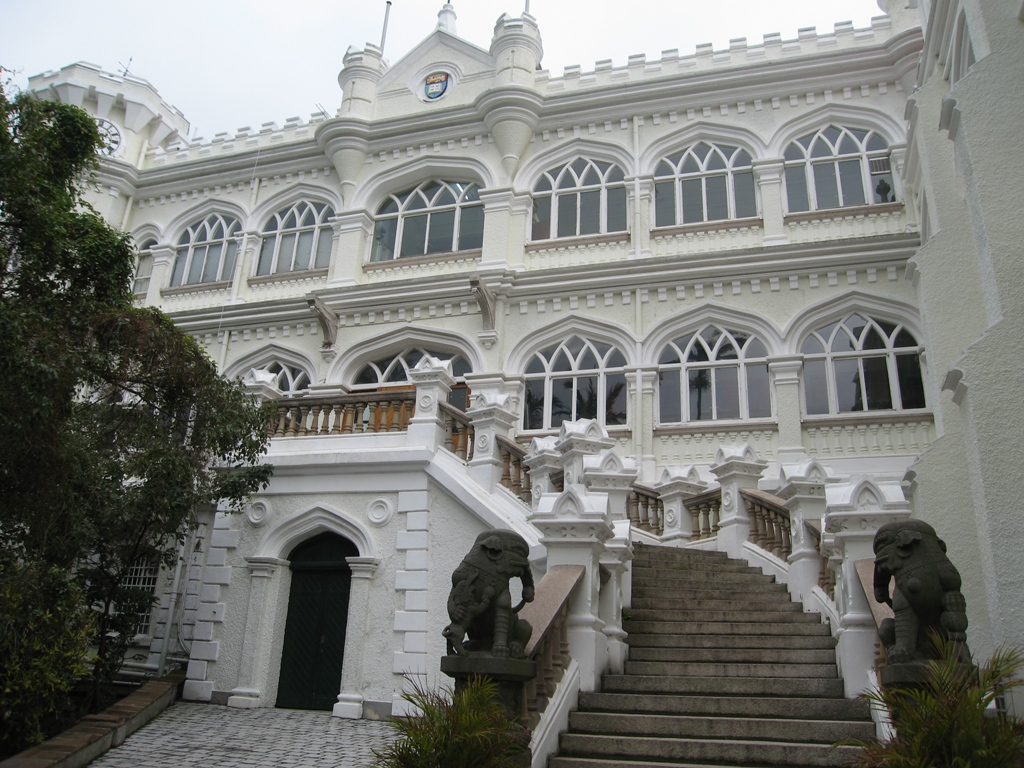
- University Hall
- Motto: "We go with brothers"
- Established: 1956
- Chancellor: Beau Lefler, Hall Warden
- Students: 110
- Location: 144 Pok Fu Lam Road, Hong Kong
- Colours: Green
- Nickname: Castlers
- Website: www.uhall.hku.hk

University Hall (Chinese: 大學堂), or UHall, is a historical residential hall for males at the University of Hong Kong. University Hall is one of the oldest residential halls under the university's hall system and houses about 110 students. Its hall colours are green, black and silver. It is located at 144 Pok Fu Lam Road, close to the Pok Fu Lam Reservoir within the Pok Fu Lam Country Park on the western side of Hong Kong Island.

The building itself dates back to 1861 when a wealthy Scottish trader named Douglas Lapraik built the Douglas Castle as the place of his residence. University Hall was formally established in 1954 after the University of Hong Kong bought the heritage building from the French Mission in Hong Kong, and the castle was officially named as the University Hall and opened as a male residential hall in 1956.

== History ==
=== The founders of Douglas Castle (1861–1894) ===
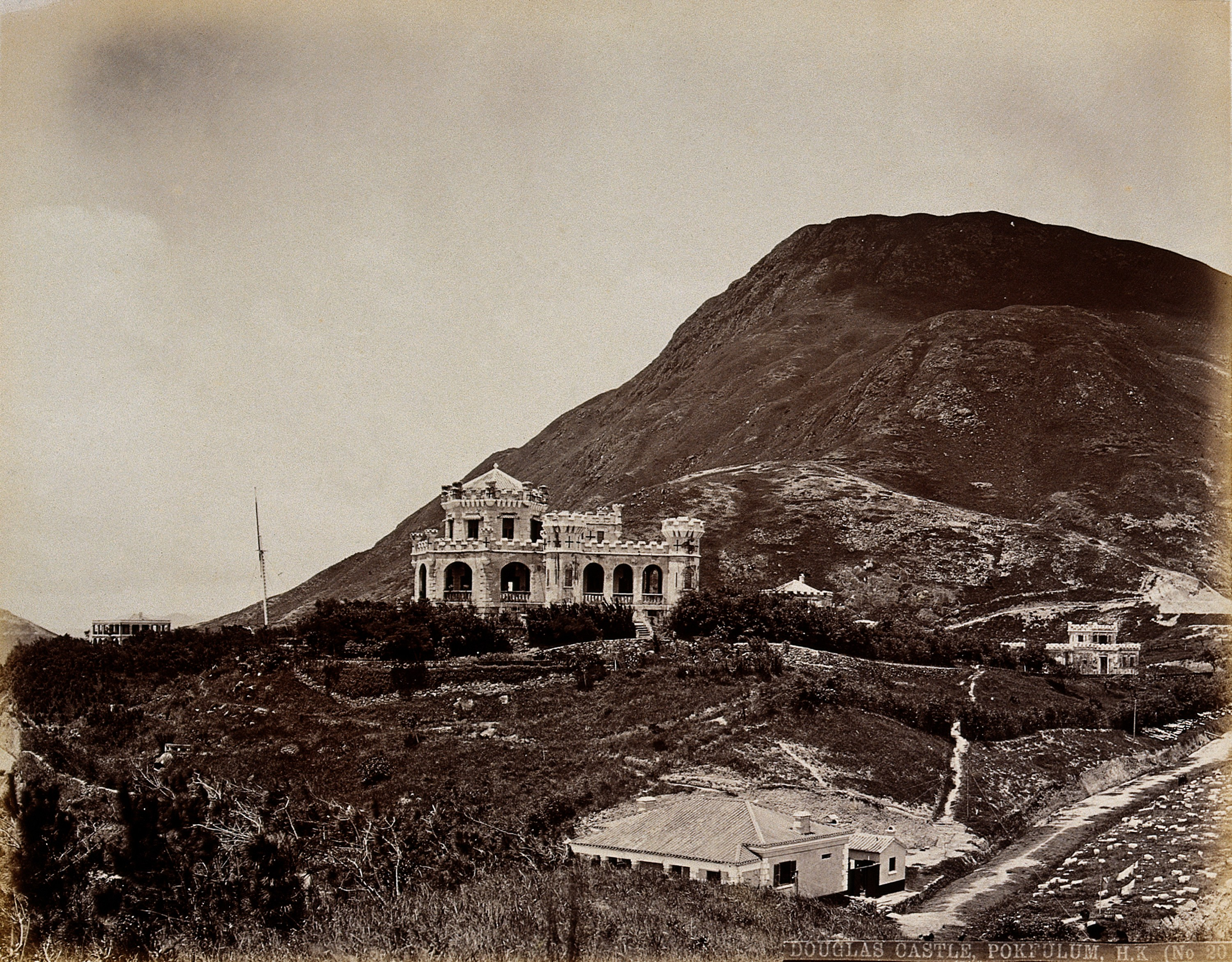
The Douglas Castle

The castle itself was established by Douglas Lapraik, a Scottish trader who made his wealth with shipbuilding and dock renting. Douglas talent for business opportunities soon made him one of the richest people in Hong Kong at his time and inspired him to improve his living conditions in line with the standards of a Tai Pan in Hong Kong. In 1860, Douglas had heard about the government's plans to build a water reservoir and park on the island's south-western part at the valley around Pok Fu Lam. The reservoir was a solution to the emergent problem of clean water supply in Hong Kong. Pok Fu Lam Road soon developed as the connection of the Western district to the smaller harbor of Hong Kong in Aberdeen, where Douglas planned to set up his docks. In 1861, he bought the 900 square meter hill, which includes the location of today's University Hall, the High West and tennis courts. During 1861–1867, Douglas built the Douglas Castle, to overlook his fleet entering and leaving the harbor. The gross building area of the castle was around 2000 square feet, which was a two-story structure, located at today's Warden Flat. In 1866, Douglas returned to Great Britain and the castle was inherited by his nephew, John Steward Lapraik.

=== Douglas Castle under the French Mission (1894–1954) ===
In 1894, Hong Kong was declared to be an infected port of the bubonic plague. The killing spree of the plague claimed thousands of lives and forced about half of the population hastily leave Hong Kong. John Douglas Steward, who was managing the castle after his father John Steward Lapraik died in 1893, had no option, but to sell the castle to the French Mission, who were some of the few who remained in Hong Kong. The building soon turned into a monastery and got renamed, Nazareth. After the plagues were sat out, Nazareth went through a major renovation under the leadership of Father Monnier, who enlarged the building with a printing house that operated one of the busiest bible printing and translation facilities of the early 20th century in Asia.

During World War I, Nazareth was used as the training base of Royal Hong Kong Regiment (The Volunteers). During the Japanese occupation of Hong Kong, Douglas Castle was confiscated by the Japanese army and used as the headquarters of kempeitai and residence for workers of the Japanese dock in Aberdeen. After Second World War came to an end in 1945 the castle was returned to the French Mission and the printing press resumed operations in 1948.

However, with the establishment of the People's Republic of China in 1949, it became difficult for overseas missionaries to penetrate the mainland. By the early 1950s, most of the foreign missionaries were forced to leave their stations in Mainland China. Hong Kong as a base for missionary work into the greater China area became increasingly unfeasible. In the coming years, Nazareth closed down. The government, which considered the castle for numerous purposes, finally decided to grant the building to the University of Hong Kong. On 4 December 1954 the building got transferred from the French Mission to the university at a price of HK$1,600,000.

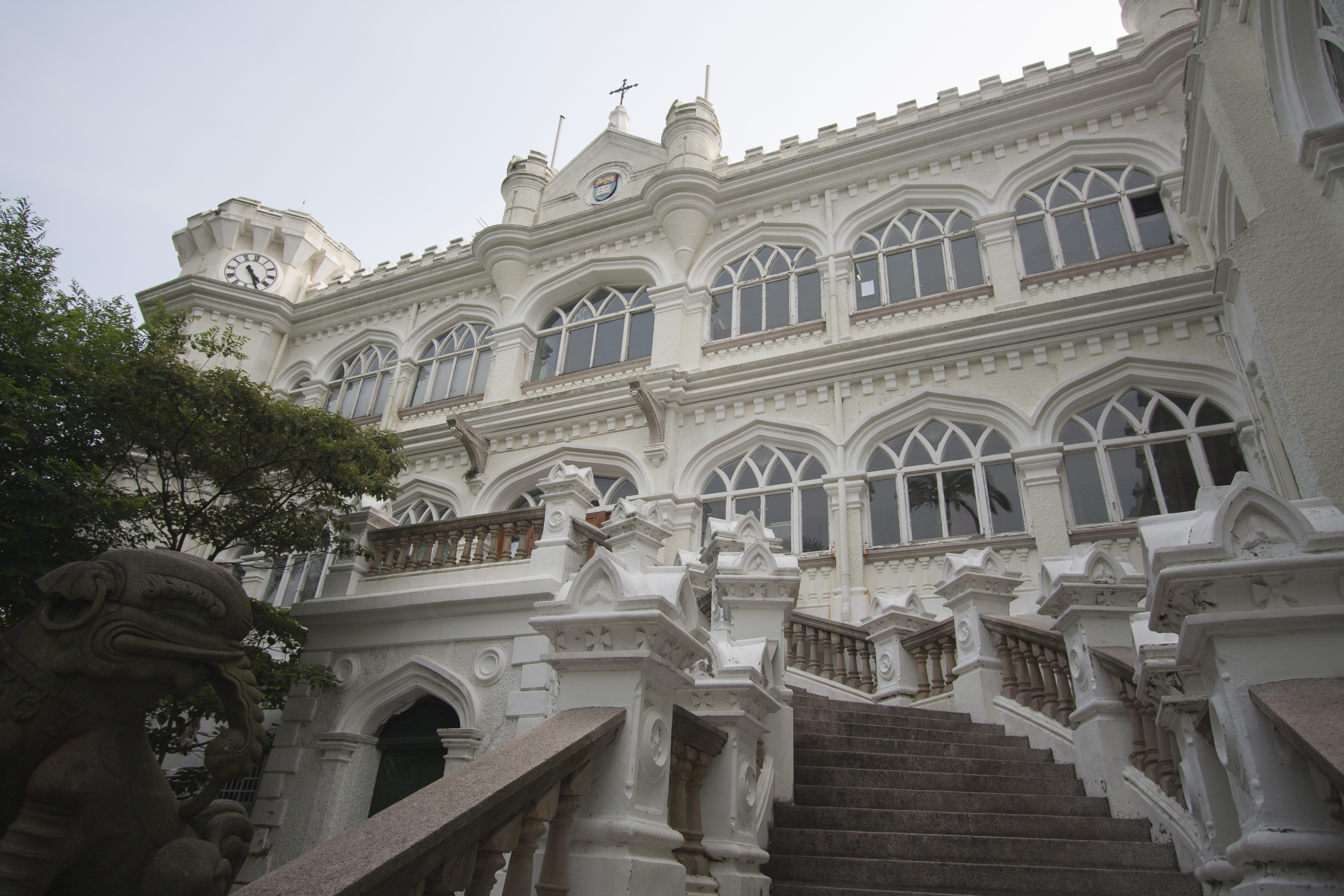
The exterior of University Hall

=== University Hall (1956 till now) ===
The university's proposal of turning Nazareth into a male dormitory was in line with the French Mission, and the transferral went smoothly. The abandoned printing workshop was demolished and turned into the carpark. The chapel and the crypt were transformed into the dining hall and common room respectively. In 1956, the first group of about 52 students, from Eliot Hall, Morrison Hall, and Lugard Hall settled in the castle.

Today, the castle on top of Pok Fu Lam hill is a reminder of the colonial history of Hong Kong. It increased its capacity to hold students to about 110 residents at a time. Over the history of the Hall, the castle had provided shelter for so far over 2000 men.

The discipline of early University Hall was very strict. Hallmates were required to report to the warden when they leave the hall or spend their nights at home, and hallmates had to wear green gowns during dinner. At that time, High Table Dinner was held every Monday, and the canteen was operated in the form of a tuck shop. Hallmates at that time were enthusiastic in activities of the Hong Kong University Students' Union, in the first 12 years of University Hall's history, 8 out of 12 presidents of the Union was from University Hall. In the early days, many hallmates were international students with talents in sports. Hockey team had outstanding performances in those days, claiming Inter-hall Champion for several times, helping University Hall to win the Malayan Cup in 1966 and 1968. Hallmates will attend all interhall competition and cheer for the athletes, they will do a War Cry if University Hall had claimed the championship, these traditions are kept until today.

== Architecture ==
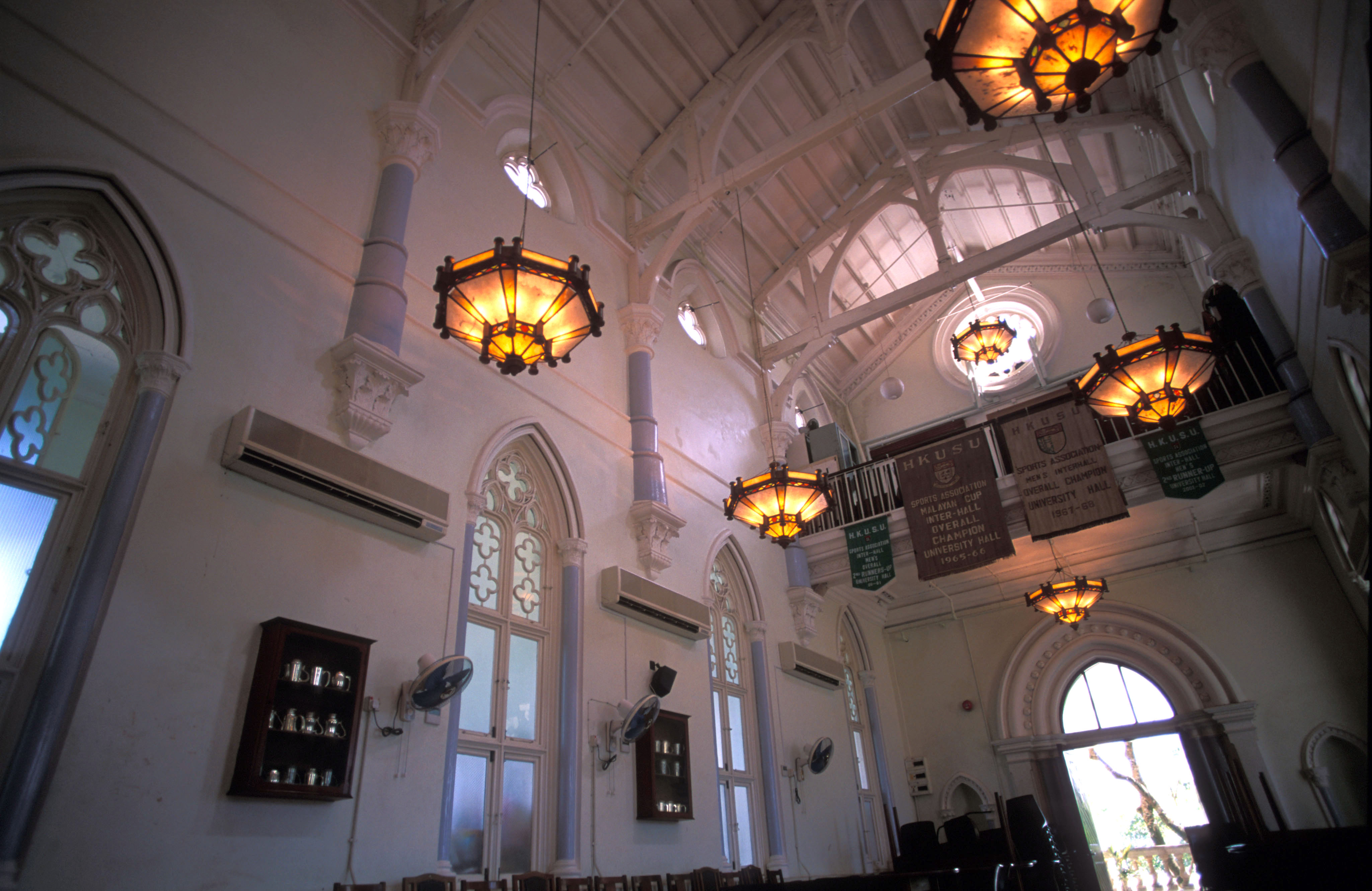
Dining Hall of University Hall

The design of the Douglas Castle was greatly influenced by English Tudor architecture and gothic styles. The registered site area counted about 310,227 square feet. When completed around 1867, the single-storey compound provided an octagonal penthouse bedroom that faced directly the sea and being surrounded by hill and the nearby water reservoir, the villa also included a side house and a rectangular outhouse. With the change in ownership to the French Missionaries in 1894, a new wing, a chapel and printing house on the north-eastern was erected in accordance with the existing style under the architects Danby, Leigh, and Orange to meet the development of the commission. The other part of the building substantially rebuilt to a 3-floor compound. Only the side towers and parts of the fundamentals remained original.

When the castle turned into "University Hall" in 1954, The university architecture lecturer Donald Liao, was given the task to rearrange the internal designs, partitions, and furniture. the high chapel got converted into a dining hall and the crypt became a common room. The Hall has now a large residence area for the Hall Warden on the position of the penthouse bedroom, staff quarters and about 33 rooms for students. On 7 September 1995, the Building was taken under the protection of the Antiquities and Monuments Ordinance and declared a monument.

== Hall culture ==
The University Hall counts as one of the traditional residential halls at the University of Hong Kong. The hall emphasizes the development of self-determination and cooperation, brotherhood with hall mates and give and take. University Hall is run under the authority of a student association elected yearly in the general assembly and the hall warden, the highest authority in the Hall. The hall has a number of hall cheers that have been awarded in numerous hall cheers completions. The hall spirit puts also much emphasis on social services, current affairs, sports and cultural activities

Recently, the development of University Hall tends to be more diversified. Apart from participating in interhall competitions, it also actively organizes and joins different activities, including a yearly Halloween ball in which the castle turns into a haunted house, Current Affairs Forum, Round Island Bike Trip, Drama Public Show and Fire Dragon crafting.

=== Sports ===
University Hall offers a number of sports, such as lacrosse, softball, hockey, dragon boat, table tennis, soccer, athletics, and snooker.

=== Cultural activities ===
University Hall participates in different interhall cultural competition, including Drama, Choir, Debate, and Bridge. Except these, the Cultural Sub-Committee of UHall organizes a "Pok Fu Lam History Tour" with Pok Fu Lam Village monthly and introduce historical sites around Pok Fu Lam (like University Hall, the Bethanie, and Pok Fu Lam Village), showing the culture and features of this community.

=== Current affairs ===
The University Hall Current Affairs Sub-Committee holds Current Affairs Forum regularly, allowing hallmates to discuss current social, political, and international issues.

=== Social service ===
The University Hall Social Service Group plans and arranges voluntary services, including service trips to elderly's home and sub-divided flats.

=== Others ===
University Hall encourages its hallmates to establish different interest groups according to their hobbies. Interest groups which are operating now include Band Team and Christian Fellowship. There exists University Hall mentorship programs for residents who wish to receive mentorship with alumini Castlers.

== Three Treasures of University Hall ==
University Hall is particularly proud of its so-called "the three treasures of University Hall". Namely the "Davids Deer", Golden Spiral Staircase and "Sam So".

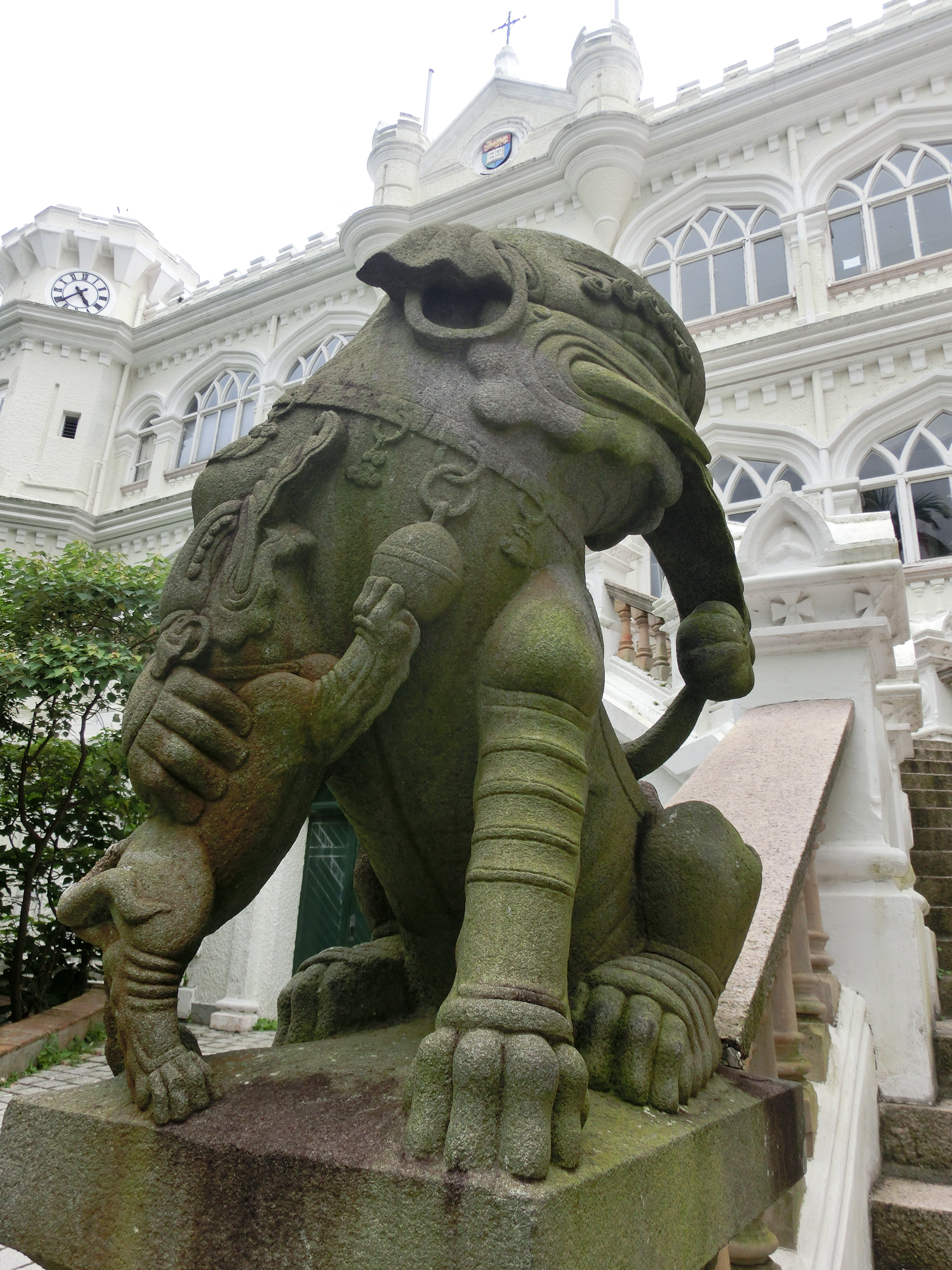
A leogryph statue, or "Davids Deer".

=== "Davids Deer" ===
Positioned at the main entrance stairs, there are two leogryph statues, one holding a ball, and one holding its cub. Although commonly called "Davids Deer" (Chinese: 四不像, literally "unlike any of the four"), the statues do not depict actual Père David's deer (also colloquially known as 四不像 in Chinese), but are instead known as such because their appearance are thought to resemble an amalgamation of four animals: an elephant, a qilin, a lion, and a horse. According to university legend, students touching the deer before their graduation risk being cursed to suffer bad grades or never graduate. To get rid of this spell, students must touch the rock lions statues located at another entrance.

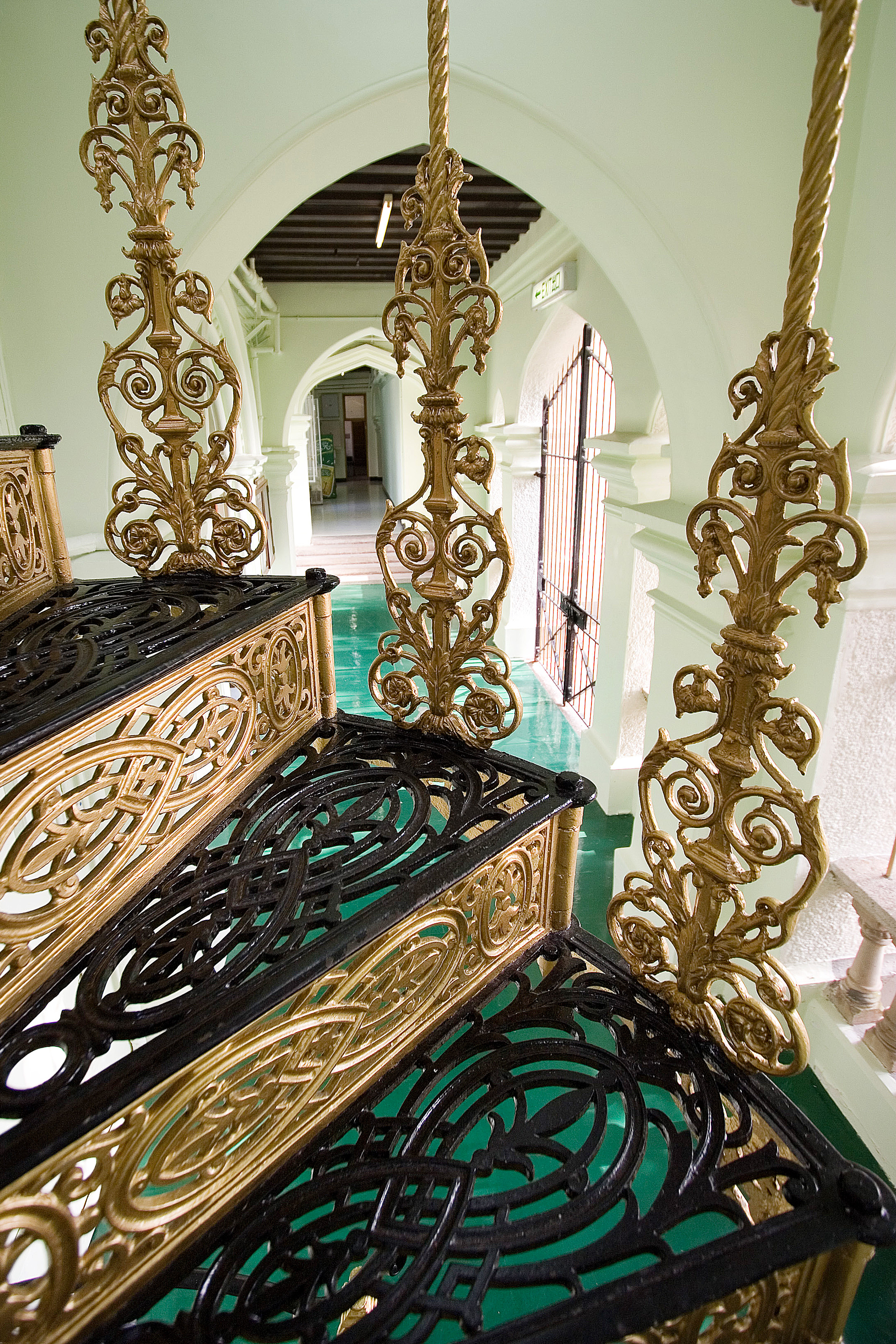
The Golden Spiral Staircase

=== Bronze Spiral Staircase ===
The bronze spiral staircase is built within the southern tower of the Hall. The staircase was said to originally be red and was called “Red Staircase”, but due to the lack of maintenance causing all the paint to fall off and resulting in the bronze colour. The myth goes that the staircase had been moved to Japan during the Japanese occupations of Hong Kong, and was returned after the war by the demand of the Hong Kong Government. It is one of the only two bronze spiral staircases in Hong Kong.

=== Sam So ===
The last treasure of the Hall is Ms Yuen So Moy "Sam So" (三嫂, literally meaning "Auntie Three") who had been working at University Hall from its very beginning as a cook and provided herself as a mother figure to some of the students throughout their life at the Hall. Sam So retired from her job in 1998 but regularly returns to the Hall for encouraging new Castlers (resident of the Hall). Sam So was granted an honorary degree by the university in 2009. Throughout the life of a Castler, they will taste the hall blood prepared by Sam So three times; when they become a castler, when they graduate, and when they get married. Hall Blood symbolises different emotions that hallmates will encounter in their life, it is a blessing from Sam So as well.

== See also ==
- Former French Mission Building
- Béthanie (Hong Kong)
