= Douglas Lapraik =

Hong Kong businessman

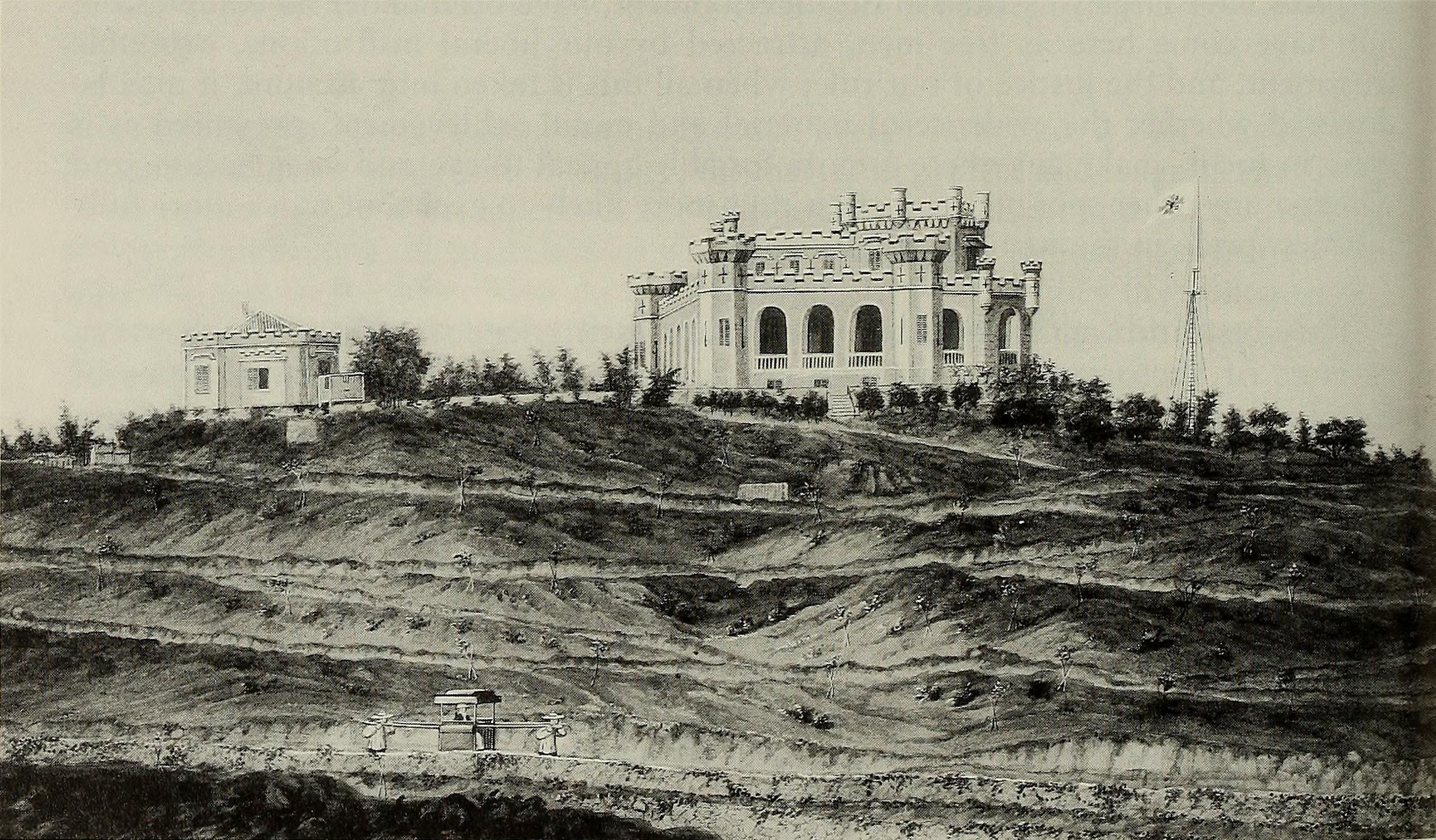
- Douglas Castle at Pok Fu Lam.
- Born: 7 October 1818; London, British Empire
- Died: 24 March 1869 (aged 50); London, British Empire
- Citizenship: British
- Occupations: Watchmaking, Shipbuilding, Property, Transport, Merchant shipping
- Years active: 1839-1869
- Spouse: Julia Hearn
- Parents: George Rankine Lapraik (father); Susan Lapraik (mother)
- Family: John Steward Lapraik, John Douglas Lapraik, Thomas Steward Lapraik

Douglas Lapraik (7 October 1818, London – 24 March 1869, London) was a British watchmaker, shipbuilder and shipping magnate of Scottish origins, most famous for his business empire and his role in the founding of many of Hong Kong's early conglomerates such as HSBC.

== Biography ==
=== Early life ===
Douglas Lapraik was born in London, England, on 7 October 1818 to George Rankine Lapraik and his wife, Susan Lapraik (Black). Though born in England, Lapraik's family was of Scottish origin, likely descended from the Lickprivick noble house of East Kilbride in the Shire of Lanark whose main holdings were Lickprivick Castle and, from the reign of Robert III in 1397, Lords of Killbride and owners of the relevant emoluments associated with the lordship. George Rankine Lapraik was originally from Muirkirk, Ayrshire, in western Scotland and worked as an expat in London for Scottish trading firm William Mathieson & Company. The couple had five children including John Lapraik (1814-1839), Douglas Lapraik and George Rankin Lapraik.

Douglas Lapraik was baptised on 2 March 1819 at the Scotch Church on London Wall in the City of London.

=== Career ===
==== Macao ====
Lapraik arrived in Macao in 1839 and became apprentice to a Scottish watch and clockmaker named Leonard Just at his company, Just & Son. In 1842, Just sent Lapraik to Hong Kong in order to open a new branch of that company in the newly founded colony.

==== Hong Kong ====
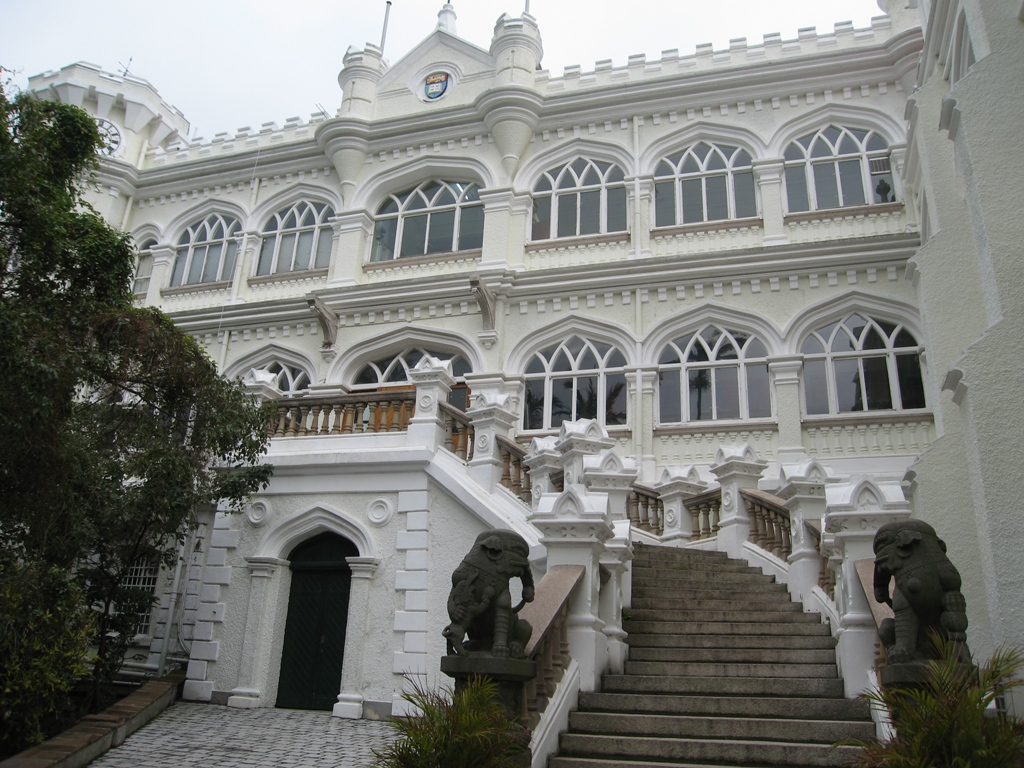
View of the main entrance to Douglas Castle at Pok Fu Lam, now University Hall, taken in 2012.

Lapraik arrived in the crown colony of Hong Kong in 1842 from Macao, following the cession of Hong Kong to the British Crown in perpetuity after the First Opium War the previous year. Soon after arriving in the colony, Lapraik established himself with his own business as a watchmaker by 1846, apparently concurrently while executing similar duties for Just & Son.

Due to his trade in chronometers and watchmaking and given the need in the colony for shipping companies to register a local address, Lapraik soon found himself drafted as a shipping agent.

Lapraik became established as a wealthy Hong Kong taipan during the 1850s and 1860s, taking part in the founding of many of the colony's business ventures and expanding his business interests to many sectors of the colony's economy.

Starting in 1855 with its founding, Lapraik served on the committee of the colony's first English-language public school, the St. Andrew's School, on Staunton Street, which closed in 1861.

In 1858, John Steward Lapraik, the son of Lapraik's eldest brother arrived in Hong Kong to join his uncle's business. Steward Lapraik would go on to later largely inherit his uncle's business empire after Lapraik's death in 1869.

In 1861, Lapraik became one of the founders of the Hong Kong Chamber of Commerce.

In 1862, Lapraik made significant contributions to the erection of the Pedder Street Clock Tower. The tower, which stood at the corner of Pedder Street and Queen's Road Central, could be seen from Victoria Harbour and debuted on New Year's Eve 1862, standing until 1913. One of the clock's faces was later incorporated into the Kowloon-Canton Railway Clock Tower at Tsimshatsui.

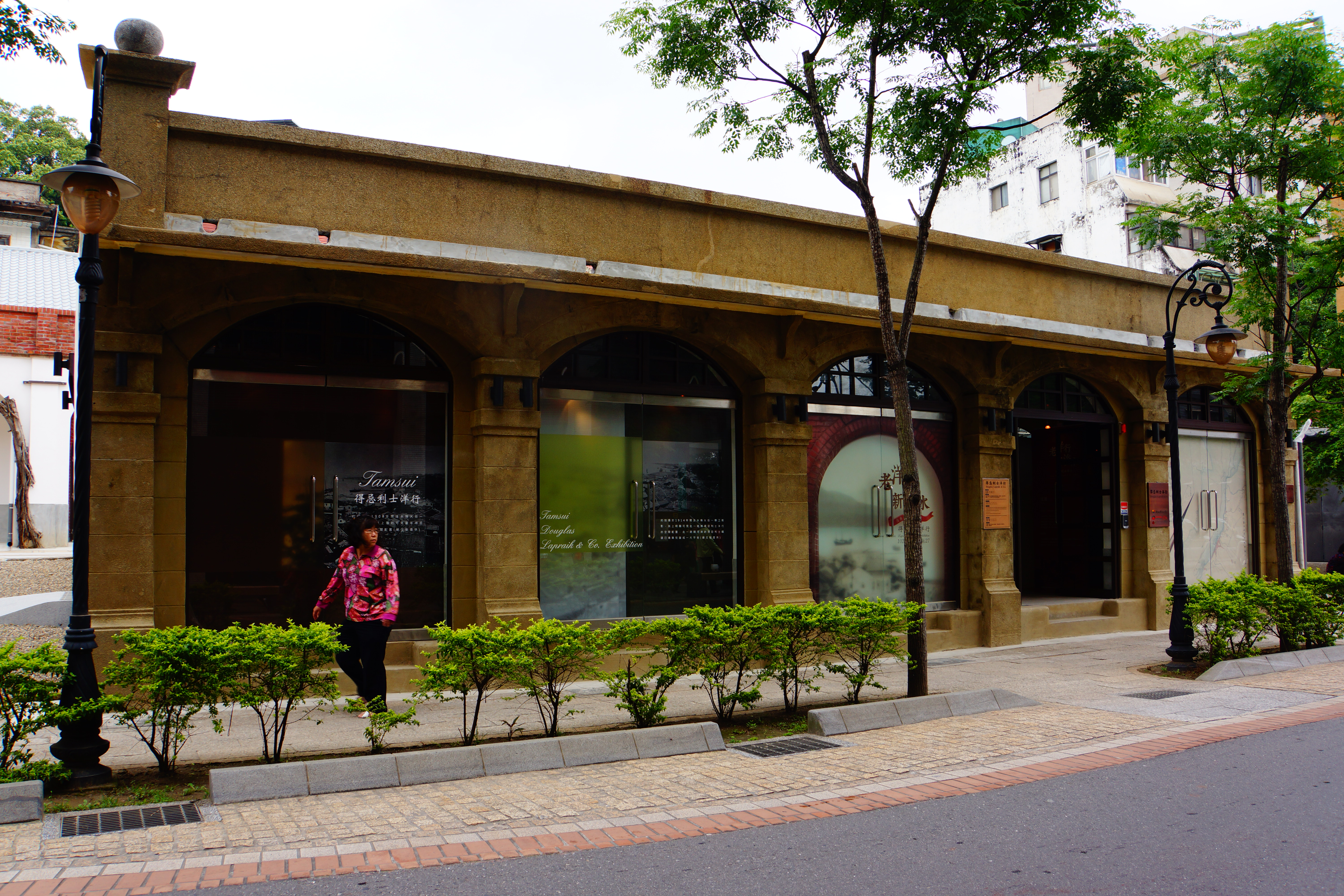
The former headquarters of Douglas Lapraik & Company in Taiwan.

In 1863, after acquiring a shipyard off Queen's Road East and building two more at Aberdeen and Whampoa, Lapraik co-founded the Hong Kong and Whampoa Dock Company together with Jardine Matheson & Company and Thomas Sutherland, the Hong Kong agent of the Peninsular and Oriental Steam Navigation Company. The company's incorporation was announced in the Hong Kong Daily Press on 4 January 1864. The dockyard would go on to become the largest shipyard in Asia at its zenith. The resulting company also became the first limited company to be registered in Hong Kong, prompting the government to begin work on the Companies Ordinance of 1865.

In 1864, Lapraik went on to be appointed as a member of the provisional founders committee of The Hongkong and Shanghai Banking Corporation which would be founded in 1865. Later in 1864, Lapraik also oversaw the completion of his Gothic style mansion at Pok Fu Lam, dubbed as Douglas Castle and today known as Nazareth House, a university house of the University of Hong Kong. Lapraik leased the 310,227-sqft. plot, then known as Rural Building Lot 32 from the government for a period of 75 years in 1861 and had been building his home and base of operations at the castle since that time, though he would not long enjoy its use.

Lapraik was also a founding director of the Hongkong, Canton & Macao Steamboat Company which was incorporated as company number 0000002 in the Hong Kong Companies Registry in 1865 when the registry was also first formed. 1865 was also the year that Lapraik began his involvement as a founding Director in the Hongkong Hotel Company together with Dutchman Charles Henri Maurice Bosman (father of Ho Fook and Robert Hotung), a Director of the Hong Kong and Whampoa Dock Company and a German, Baron Gustav von Overbeck, the Prussian and Austrian Consul in Hong Kong. The company opened the Hongkong Hotel in 1868 on Pedder Street and Queen's Road Central, then the first luxury hotel in the city. The hotel group would go on to become the Hongkong and Shanghai Hotels Group.

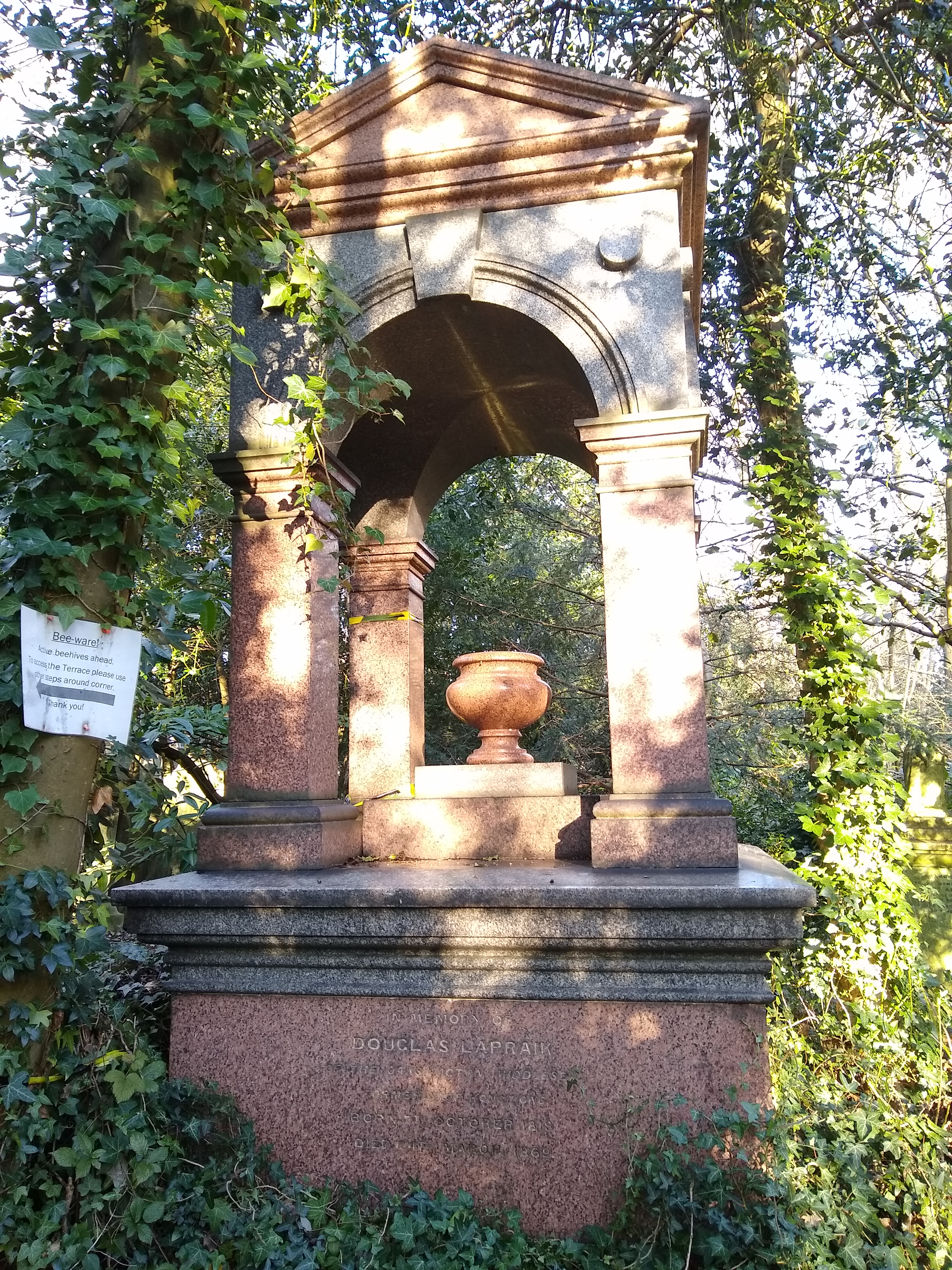
Grave of Douglas Lapraik in Highgate Cemetery (West Side)

Lapraik left Hong Kong and returned to London in mid 1866, apparently due to health issues. In 1855, Lapraik transferred all interest in his watchmaking company, Douglas Lapraik China to his colleague, George Falconer, with whom he had previously apprenticed in his youth at Just & Son. The company was renamed as George Falconer & Company, sold to the Lee Hing Group in 1997.

== Death ==
Lapraik retired and returned to England in 1866 after settling a trust in favour of his longtime Chinese mistress. After returning, married 28-year-old Julia Hearn in November 1866. The couple had no children. He died in London in March 1869 without any legitimate heir and is buried at Highgate Cemetery (West Side).

== Family and descendants ==
Lapraik married 28 year old Julia Hearn, a daughter of the lord of Carisbrooke Castle, in November 1866. The couple had no children and Lapraik died in March 1869. After Lapraik's death, his nephew, John Steward Lapraik founded the Douglas Steamship Company in 1883 which continued to run Lapraik's steamer business and which also took up management of other assets owned by Douglas Lapraik & Company.

In 1867, Jane Lapraik, Lapraik's niece and sister of John Steward Lapraik was married in Hong Kong to Robert Ellis Baker. John Steward Lapraik continued his uncle's business activities in Hong Kong until his death in 1893, having two children named John Douglas Lapraik (1866) and Thomas Steward Lapraik (1867) who also continued in the business.

== Legacy ==
=== Law ===
Between 1856 and 1861, Lapraik together with George Chape brought a suit as plaintiffs against the Respondent, Silas Enoch Burrows, in a suit which traveled from the lower Vice Admiralty Court before finally in 1859, being heard before the High Court of Hong Kong concerning the disputed ownership of the steamer SS Australia. The ship arrived at Hong Kong in around 1852, badly damaged and in need of repairs. Costs of the repairs in question exceeded the actual value of the ship, exacerbated by the debts accrued for wages and expenses owed. Permission for the master to sell the ship would have taken up to four months to obtain from its American owners and there was no available financial options for the ship's master. The circumstances necessitated that the master sell the ship without waiting for the relevant permission to do so. The case helped to develop the concept of agency by necessity in case law as it relates to commercial law which grants the master of the ship the responsibility of acting as agent for the owner of any vessel in the existence of emergency situations, inability to communicate with the principal and provided that such agent is acting in good faith.

=== Namesakes ===
- Douglas Street, Central, Hong Kong
- Douglas Lane, Central, Hong Kong
- Douglas Castle, Pok Fu Lam
- Douglas Villas, Central Mid-Levels, Hong Kong
