= Douglas Lane =

Street in Hong Kong

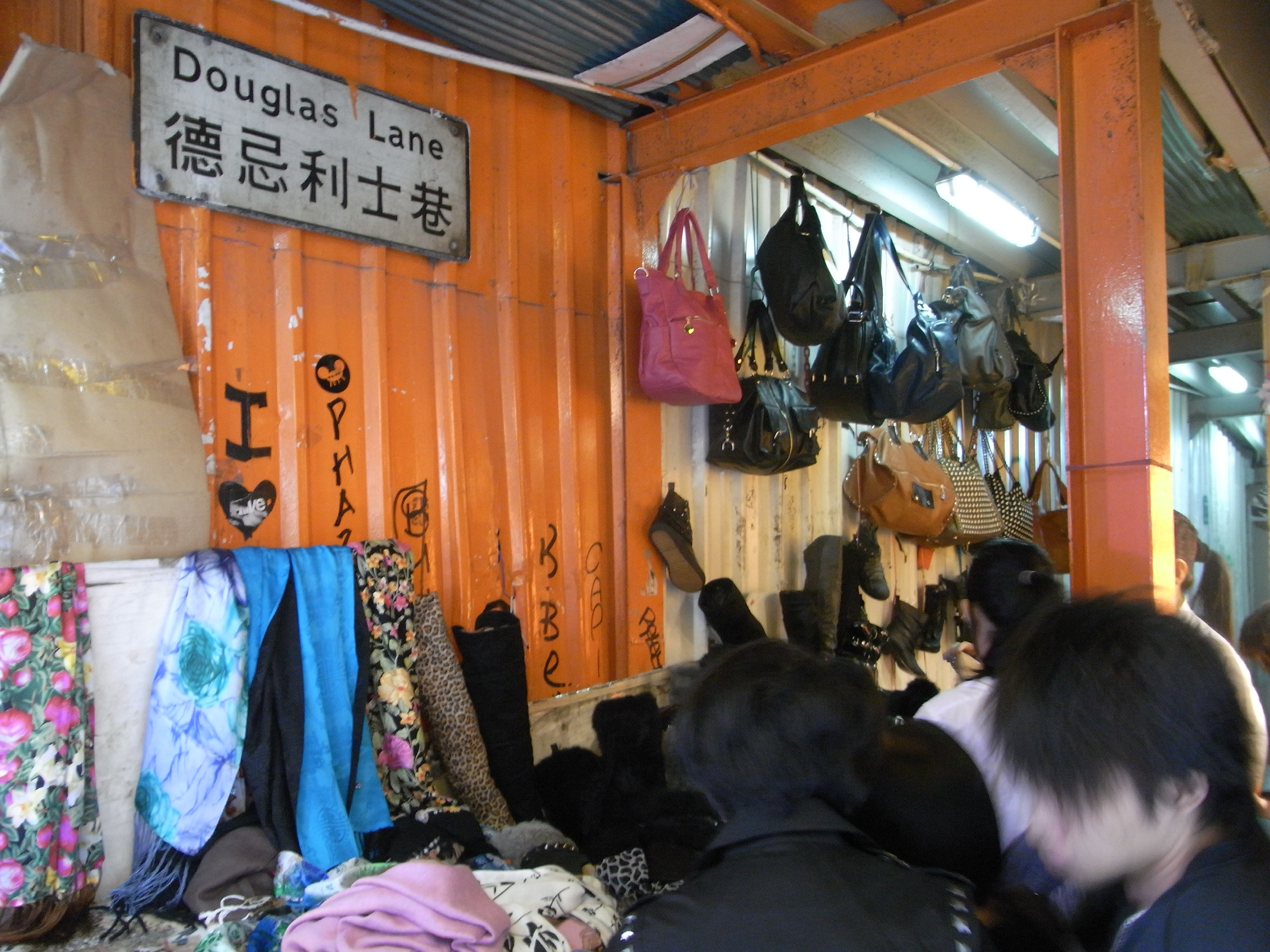
- A view of the street shops of Douglas Lane in November 2010.
- Traditional Chinese: 德忌利士巷
- Simplified Chinese: 德忌利士巷
Transcriptions
Standard Mandarin
- Hanyu Pinyin: Dé jì lì shì xiàng
Yue: Cantonese
- Yale Romanization: dāk geih leih sih/sí hohng/hóng
- Jyutping: dak1 gei6 lei6 si6/si2 hong6/hong2

Douglas Lane (Chinese: 德忌利士巷) is a lane converted for pedestrian use in the core of Hong Kong's Central District. It runs north-south from Des Voeux Road Central to Queen's Road Central. though the street name is continued in Douglas Street which continues to its north across Des Voeux Road Central all the way to Connaught Road Central. The lane is named for Hong Kong tai-pan Douglas Lapraik.

== History ==
The lane is named after Hong Kong tai-pan Douglas Lapraik, whose dockyard and subsequent Douglas Steamship Company wharf was once located in the area now reclaimed and the site of Exchange Square. The lane has also been adapted to serve as an outdoor bazaar. Douglas Lane has been dubbed as a Hawker Blackspot for Central and Western District, meaning that the Food and Environmental Hygiene Department would give no warning to hawkers at the location before taking prosecution actions against them if they are caught.

== Location ==
Douglas Lane runs a distance of around 350 ft between and perpendicular to Des Voeux Road Central and Queen's Road Central.

== Current buildings ==
- King Fook Building
- Prosperity Tower
- Yu To Sang Building
- Eubank Plaza
- Chiu Lung Building
- Bangkok Bank Building

== See also ==
- Douglas Lapraik
