= Douglas Steamship Company =

Former British merchant shipping and trading company

- flag of the Douglas Steamship Company.
- Company type: Private company limited by shares
- Industry: Shipping, Transport, Freight, Merchant shipping
- Founded: July 28, 1883; 142 years ago at Hong Kong
- Founder: John Steward Lapraik
- Defunct: June 1, 1987
- Fate: Defunct
- Headquarters: Central, Hong Kong, British Empire
- Area served: China trade
- Key people: John Steward Lapraik, Stuart Taylor Williamson, John Robertson Mullion, James Robertson Mullion, Robert Ho Tung, John David Alexander, Chun Chik Yu (Chun Tong)
- Products: Ship Management, Ferry, Ocean liners, Property, Container ships, Packet boats

The Douglas Steamship Company was a British merchant shipping and maritime trading company founded in 1883 in the Crown colony of Hong Kong by John Steward Lapraik and dissolved in 1987.

== History ==
After arriving in Hong Kong in 1858 to join his uncle, Douglas Lapraik's shipping empire at Douglas Lapraik & Company, John Steward Lapraik quickly became one of main figures in the business. With the death of Douglas Lapraik in 1869, John Steward Lapraik became one of the main beneficiaries of his uncle's estate together with Robert Ellis Baker, William Lane and Robert Manger.

Due likely to reasons related to desired control over operations underway at Douglas Lapraik & Company and future expansion opportunities, in 1883, John Steward Lapraik founded the Douglas Steamship Company 28 July 1883 with two partners. The company, named for Hong Kong Tai-pan Douglas Lapraik, became registered as HKCR No. 0000012, the 12th limited company ever registered in the colony.

By 1892, the Douglas Steamship Company successfully acquired the operations of Francis Cass of Amoy to form a new subsidiary called Lapraik, Cass & Company which would continue operations out of Amoy. In the same year, Douglas Steamship Company also acquired Dodd & Company of Tamsui on Formosa which would go on to be a bastion of the company's activities. The Tamsui subsidiary was dubbed Dodd and Lapraik & Company (Chinese: 知海闇及道德公司). The same year, the Douglas Steamship Company issued around $1,000,000 HKD in new share capital following the publication of a prospectus.

In 1893, John Steward Lapraik died of heart disease in Hong Kong at the age of 54 and a large portion of his estate was passed to his son, John Douglas Lapraik. T. E. Davies succeeded in taking control of the company following the death of Steward Lapraik with Davis being succeeded in turn in 1900 by JH Lewis who ran the company together with John Douglas Lapraik and Henry Percy White.

By the early 1900s, the Douglas Steamship Company had become one of the largest shipping companies in Asia. In Hong Kong, the company moved its headquarters from the Praya, or Connaught Road following the Praya Reclamation Scheme, to Douglas Street, Central. In Formosa, the company had managed to gain a monopoly on the popular Tamsui-Amoy route. Indeed, the company's success was apparently seen as a threat to the island's Japanese government and in March of 1899, Governor Kodama Gentarō issued secret orders subsidising Japanese companies to compete with Douglas Steamship Company. The resulting price war forced the Douglas Steamship Company to cease all business operations at Taiwan by 1904.

After the loss of the Formosa trade, the company retained its operations in the China and river trade, however it met with financial difficulties by the late 1920s. In 1932, Stewart Taylor Williamson acquired a controlling stake in the Douglas Steamship Company. With the outbreak of WWII, the company had most of its ships seized by the Ministry of War Transport and with the capture of Hong Kong by the Imperial Japanese Army in December 1941, most of the staff of the DSCo were interred in prison camps in Hong Kong, including Stewart Taylor Williamson. After the war, the company resumed its operations with the two remaining ships that survived the war.

Stewart Taylor Williamson died suddenly on 5 September 1950, ceding control of the company to James Robertson Mullion who became the new chairman with Robert Ho Tung and John David Alexander serving as directors. Considering the exposed financial state of the company, Mullion divested of the remaining two ships and focused the business activities of the company in investments. By the mid 1950s, the company had secured its finances enough to resume its investments in shipping and it acquired three further ships.

By 1969, James Robertson Mullion became the controlling stakeholder of DSCo and he attempted to introduce several structural changes to the business, however, by 1972, the company was running large losses and Mullion was forced to inject $1.3 Million HKD of his own money into the company to keep it solvent. This move was eventually unsuccessful and by 21 July 1976, the company's board voted to enter liquidation and wind up the company. The dissolution was made formally on 15 April 1985 and DSCo was dissolved on 1 June 1987.

== Fleet ==
=== List of DSCo ships ===
Name	Homeport	Type	Owner/Operator	Year Built	Tonnage	Route	Notes
SS Douglas	Hong Kong	hybrid passenger and cargo schooner/steamer	Douglas Lapraik & Company; Douglas Steamship Company	1873	1,373 GRT	Amoy-Foochow Line	Ran aground and wrecked between Passage Island and the North Tit Rocks in the Haitan Strait on 14 November 1880 while en route to Fuzhou (Foochow) from Amoy.
SS Formosa	Hong Kong	steamer	Douglas Steamship Company	1882	1,097 GRT	China trade	Sold to Spanish company Urrtiua & Company and renamed as the SS Cantabria in 1903.
SS Hai Mun	Hong Kong	steamer	Douglas Steamship Company	1896	1,248 GRT	China trade	Sold in 1928.
SS Hai Hong	Hong Kong	steamer	Douglas Steamship Company	1898	2,027 GRT	China trade	Built by Armstrong Whitworth in 1898. Acquired in 1915 by DSCo from the Union Steam Ship Company of New Zealand. Later sold in 1928 to Ferrandez Hermanos Inc of Manila as SS Mactan.
SS Earl of Douglas	Hong Kong	steamer	Douglas Steamship Company	1906	3,536 GRT	China trade	
SS Haiyang	Hong Kong	steamer	Douglas Steamship Company	1908	2,300 GRT	China trade	

== See also ==
- China Navigation Company
- China trade
- Douglas Lapraik
- Hong Kong, Canton & Macao Steamboat Company
