= Douglas Street, Hong Kong =

Street in Hong Kong

Douglas Street
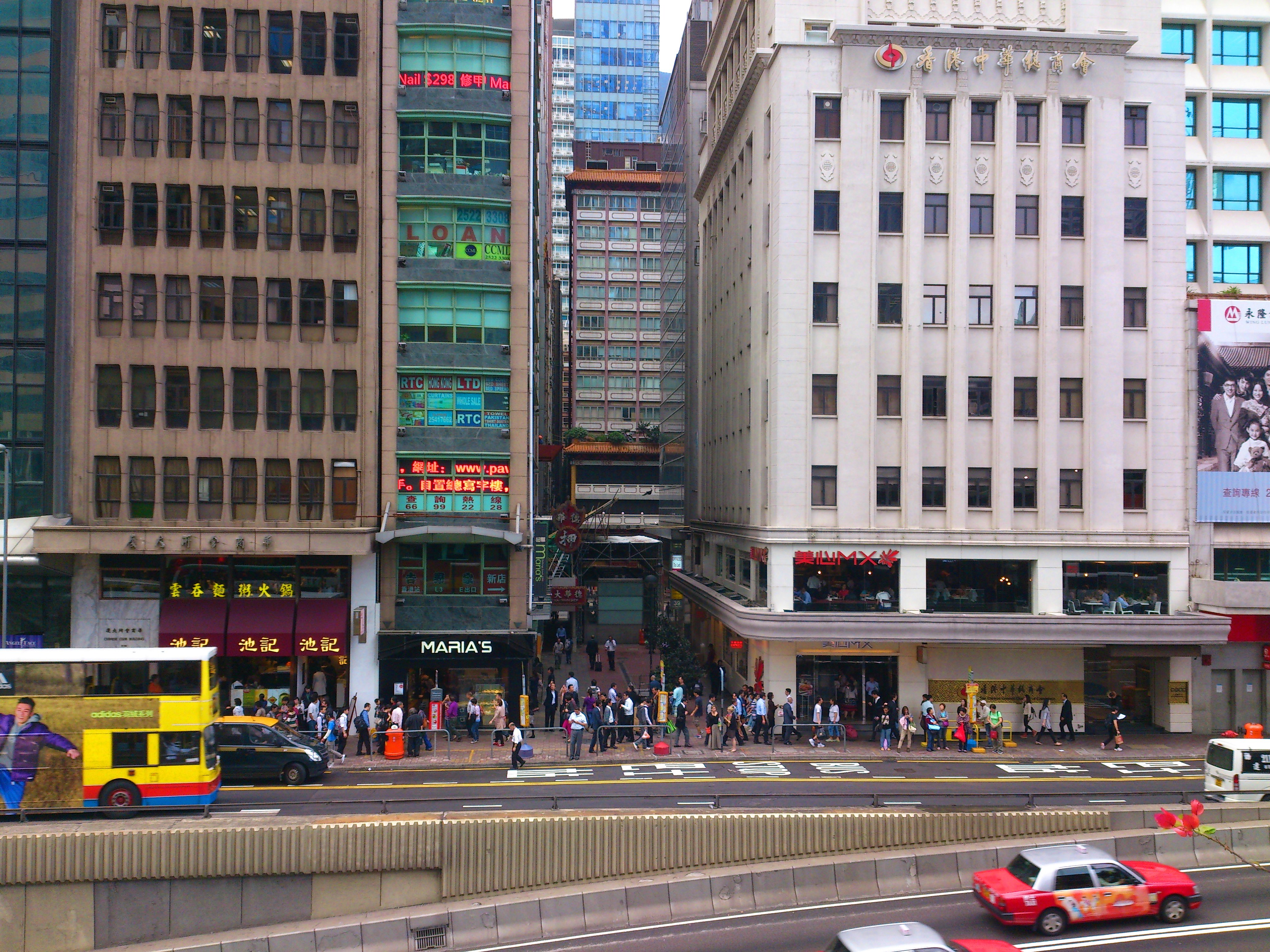
- A view of Douglas Street from the harbourfront area in November 2012.
- Traditional Chinese: 德忌利士街
- Simplified Chinese: 德忌利士街
Transcriptions
Standard Mandarin
- Hanyu Pinyin: Dé jì lì shì jiē
Yue: Cantonese
- Yale Romanization: dāk geih leih sih/sí gāai
- Jyutping: dak1 gei6 lei6 si6/si2 gaai1

Douglas Street (Chinese: 德忌利士街) is a pedestrianised street in Central, Hong Kong. It runs north-south from Connaught Road Central to Des Voeux Road Central, and ends at its intersection with Des Voeux Road Central, though the street name is continued in Douglas Lane which continues almost all the way to Queen's Road Central before curving and converging with Li Yuen Street East.

== History ==
The street is named after Hong Kong tai-pan Douglas Lapraik, whose dockyard was once located in the area now reclaimed and the site of Exchange Square. Douglas Street has been dubbed as a Hawker Blackspot for Central and Western District, meaning that the Food and Environmental Hygiene Department would give no warning to hawkers at the location before taking prosecution actions against them if they are caught.

In the 1990s, the street was permanently closed to traffic in order to make way for an entrance to the Central Subway, a tunnel connecting Central and Hong Kong stations of the Mass Transit Railway (MTR). The street closure was gazetted on 18 November 1994.

== Location ==
Douglas Street has a length of 0.08 kilometres. As the street has been converted for pedestrian use, MTR was granted permission to use the street as the location for Exit C of Hong Kong station. Underneath Douglas Street runs a major portion of the pedestrian subway linking Hong Kong station to Central station within the paid area. The Douglas Street MTR entrance is roughly halfway between the two station concourses.

== Current buildings ==
- The Chinese Club Building
- Chinese General Chamber of Commerce Building
- China State Bank Building
- Heung Lam Building
- 33 Des Voeux Road Central
